Franz Schubert's compositions of 1815 are mostly in the Deutsch catalogue (D) range D 127–330, and include:
 Instrumental works:
 Symphony No. 3, D 200
 String Quartet No. 9, D 173
 Piano Sonata in E major, D 157
 Piano Sonata in C major, D 279
 Vocal music:
 Der vierjährige Posten, D 190
 Die Freunde von Salamanka, D 326
 Mass No. 2, D 167
 Mass No. 3, D 324
 Stabat Mater in G minor, D 175
 "Schwertlied", D 170
 "An die Freude", D 189
 "Rastlose Liebe", D 138
 "Der Mondabend", D 141
 "An Mignon", D 161
 "Wandrers Nachtlied", D 224
 "Heidenröslein", D 257
 "Vaterlandslied", D 287
 "Sehnsucht", D 310
 "Mignon", D 321
 "Hermann und Thusnelda", D 322
 "Harfenspieler", D 325
 "Erlkönig", D 328

Table

Legend

List

|-
| 128
| 128
| data-sort-value="XXX,1897" | (1897)
| data-sort-value="2103,023" | XXI, 3No. 23
| data-sort-value="726,00" | VII/2, 6
| data-sort-value="Viennese German Dances, 12" | Twelve Viennese German Dances
| data-sort-value="key I" | Various keys
| data-sort-value="1812-01-01" | 1812?
| For piano; Includes introduction; No. 12 related to 
|-
| 129
| 129
| data-sort-value="XXX,1892" | (1892)
| data-sort-value="1900,016" | XIXNo. 16
| data-sort-value="304,18" | III, 4 No. 18
| Mailied, D 129
| data-sort-value="text Gruner wird die Au 1" | Grüner wird die Au
| data-sort-value="1815-01-01" | 1815?
| data-sort-value="Text by Holty, Ludwig Heinrich Christoph, Gruner wird die Au 1" | Text by Hölty (other settings:  and 503); For ttb
|-
| 130
| 130
| data-sort-value="XXX,1892" | (1892)
| data-sort-value="1900,025" | XIXNo. 25
| data-sort-value="304,19" | III, 4 No. 19VIII, 2 No. 24
| data-sort-value="Schnee Zerrinnt, Der" | Der Schnee Zerrinnt
| data-sort-value="text Der Schnee Zerrinnt 1" | Der Schnee Zerrinnt
| data-sort-value="1815-01-01" | 1815?
| data-sort-value="Text by Holty, Ludwig Heinrich Christoph, Der Schnee Zerrinnt 1" | Text by Hölty; Canon for three voices
|-
| 131
| 131
| data-sort-value="XXX,1892" | (1892)
| data-sort-value="1900,028" | XIXNo. 28
| data-sort-value="304,20" | III, 4 No. 20VIII, 2 No. 26
| Lacrimoso son io
| data-sort-value="text Lacrimoso son io" | Lacrimoso son io
| data-sort-value="1815-01-01" | 1815?
| Canon for three voices; Two versions: 2nd is "Lacrimosa son io"
|-
| 134
| 134
| data-sort-value="126,1830" | 126p(1830)
| data-sort-value="2002,099" | XX, 2No. 99
| data-sort-value="407,21" | IV, 7 No. 21
| Ballade
| data-sort-value="text Ein Fraulein schaut vom hohen Turm" | Ein Fräulein schaut vom hohen Turm
| data-sort-value="1815-01-01" | 1815?
| data-sort-value="Text by Kenner, Joseph, Ein Fraulein schaut vom hohen Turm" | Text by Kenner
|-
| 135
| 135
| data-sort-value="XXX,1930" | (1930)
| data-sort-value="ZZZZ" |
| data-sort-value="726,00" | VII/2, 6
| data-sort-value="German Dance with Trio, D 135" | German Dance with Trio, D 135
| data-sort-value="key E major" | E major
| data-sort-value="1815-01-01" | 1815
| For piano; Variant of  No. 3 (other Trio)
|-
| 136
| 136
| data-sort-value="046,1825" | 46(1825)
| data-sort-value="1400,001" | XIV No. 1
| data-sort-value="108,00" | I, 8
| data-sort-value="Offertory, D 136" | Offertory, D 136, a.k.a. Offertory No. 1
| data-sort-value="text Totus in corde langueo" | Totus in corde langueoC major
| data-sort-value="1815-01-01" | 1815?
| For s or t, clarinet or violin, and orchestra
|-
| 137
| 137
| data-sort-value="XXX,1893" | (1893)
| data-sort-value="1507,014" | XV, 7No. 14
| data-sort-value="212,00" | II, 12
| Adrast
| data-sort-value="theatre (Singspiel)" | (Singspiel)
| data-sort-value="1820-01-01" | fall 1819–early1820
| data-sort-value="Text by Mayrhofer, Johann Adrast" | Text by Mayrhofer; For stbTTBB and orchestra; Nos. 1–8 complete (abandoned variants for some numbers, Nos. 1–7 in AGA) and sketches and fragments for six further numbers; Overture: ?
|-
| 138
| 138
| data-sort-value="005,1821-1" | 5,1(1821)(1970)
| data-sort-value="2003,177" | XX, 3No. 177
| data-sort-value="401,0051" | IV, 1a &b No. 6
| Rastlose Liebe
| data-sort-value="text Dem Schnee, dem Regen, dem Wind entgegen" | Dem Schnee, dem Regen, dem Wind entgegen
| data-sort-value="1821-05-01" | 19/5/1815–May 1821
| data-sort-value="Text by Goethe, Johann Wolfgang von, Dem Schnee dem Regen dem Wind entgegen" | Text by Goethe; Two versions: 1st, in AGA, is Op. 5 No. 1
|-
| 139
| 139
| data-sort-value="XXX,1930" | (1930)
| data-sort-value="ZZZZ" |
| data-sort-value="726,00" | VII/2, 6
| data-sort-value="German Dance with Trio, D 139" | German Dance with Trio, D 139
| data-sort-value="key C-sharp major A major" | C major (Trio in A major)
| data-sort-value="1815-01-01" | 1815
| For piano
|-
| 140
| 140
| data-sort-value="XXX,1850" | (1850)
| data-sort-value="1800,006" | XVIIINo. 6
| data-sort-value="303,03" | III, 3 No. 3
| Klage um Ali Bey, D 140
| data-sort-value="text Lasst mich! lasst mich! ich will klagen 1" | Laßt mich! laßt mich! ich will klagen
| data-sort-value="1815-01-01" | 1815
| data-sort-value="Text by Claudius, Matthias, Lasst mich! lasst mich! ich will klagen 1" | Text by Claudius; For ttb (and piano?)
|-
| 141
| 141
| data-sort-value="131,1830-1" | 131p,1(1830)
| data-sort-value="2002,043" | XX, 2No. 43
| data-sort-value="407,23" | IV, 7 No. 23
| data-sort-value="Mondabend, Der" | Der Mondabend
| data-sort-value="text Rein und freundlich lacht der Himmel" | Rein und freundlich lacht der Himmel
| data-sort-value="1815-01-01" | 1815
| data-sort-value="Text by Kumpf, Johann Gottfried, Rein und freundlich lacht der Himmel"| Text by 
|-
| 142
| 142
| data-sort-value="092,1828-3" | 92,3(1828)(1885)(1895)
| data-sort-value="2003,174" | XX, 3No. 174
| data-sort-value="405,00" | IV, 5
| data-sort-value="Geistes-Gruss" | Geistes-Gruß
| data-sort-value="text Hoch auf dem alten Turme steht" | Hoch auf dem alten Turme steht
| data-sort-value="1821-12-01" | beforeApr. 1816–afterNov. 1821
| data-sort-value="Text by Goethe, Johann Wolfgang von, Hoch auf dem alten Turme steht" | Text by Goethe; Six versions: 2nd publ. in 1885 – 3rd and 5th not in AGA – 6th is Op. 92 No. 3
|-
| 143
| 143
| data-sort-value="109,1829-2" | 109p,2(1829)
| data-sort-value="2003,181" | XX, 3No. 181
| data-sort-value="407,24" | IV, 7 No. 24
| data-sort-value="Genugsamkeit" | Genügsamkeit
| data-sort-value="text Dort raget ein Berg aus den Wolken her" | Dort raget ein Berg aus den Wolken her
| data-sort-value="1815-01-01" | 1815
| data-sort-value="Text by Schober, Franz von, Dort raget ein Berg aus den Wolken her" | Text by Schober; Intro in 1st ed. not by Schubert
|-
| 144
| 144
| data-sort-value="XXX,1895" | (1895)
| data-sort-value="2211,209" | XXII,  11No. 209
| data-sort-value="407,99" | IV, 7Anh. No. 9
| Romanze, D 144
| data-sort-value="text In der Vater Hallen ruhte" | In der Väter Hallen ruhte
| data-sort-value="1816-04-01" | April 1816
| data-sort-value="Text by Stolberg-Stolberg, Friedrich Leopold zu, In der Vater Hallen ruhte" | Text by Stolberg-Stolberg; Fragment
|-
| 145
| 145
| data-sort-value="018,1823-0" | 18(1823)
| data-sort-value="1200,002" | XIINo. 2
| data-sort-value="726,71" | VII/2, 6& 7a
| data-sort-value="Waltzes, 12, D 145" | 12 Waltzes, 17 Ländler and 9 Écossaises, D 145
| data-sort-value="key I" | Various keys
| data-sort-value="1821-07-01" | –July 1821
| For piano; Waltz No. 7 ≈  No. 2; Écossaises Nos. 5 and 6 identical to  No. 1 and 697 No. 5
|-
| 146
| 146
| data-sort-value="127,1830-0" | 127p(1824)(1830)
| data-sort-value="1200,008" | XIINo. 8
| data-sort-value="726,72" | VII/2, 6& 7a
| data-sort-value="Waltzes, 20, D 146" | 20 Waltzes, D 146, a.k.a. Letzte Walzer
| data-sort-value="key I" | Various keys
| data-sort-value="1823-02-01" | 1815–Feb. 1823
| For piano; No. 2 publ. in 1824, all 20 as Op. posth. 127 in 1830
|-
| 147
| 147
| data-sort-value="XXX,1892" | (1892)
| data-sort-value="1900,015" | XIXNo. 15
| data-sort-value="304,21" | III, 4 No. 21
| Bardengesang
| data-sort-value="text Rolle, du stromigter Carun" | Rolle, du strömigter Carun
| data-sort-value="1816-01-20" | 20/1/1816?
| data-sort-value="Text by Macpherson, James (Ossian) from Comala, Rolle, du stromigter Carun" | Text by Macpherson (Ossian), from Comala, transl. by E. Baron de Harold
|-
| 148
| 148
| data-sort-value="131,1830-2" | 131p,2(1830)
| data-sort-value="1900,008" | XIXNo. 8
| data-sort-value="303,04" | III, 3 No. 4
| data-sort-value="Trinklied, D 148" | Trinklied, D 148
| data-sort-value="text Bruder! unser Erdenwallen" | Brüder! unser Erdenwallen
| data-sort-value="1815-02-01" | February1815
| data-sort-value="Text by Castelli, Ignaz Franz, Bruder! unser Erdenwallen" | Text by Castelli; For tTTB and piano
|-
| 149
| 149
| data-sort-value="117,1829-0" | 117p(1829)(1894)
| data-sort-value="2002,045" | XX, 2No. 45
| data-sort-value="407,25" | IV, 7 No. 25
| data-sort-value="Sanger, Der" | Der Sänger
| data-sort-value="text Was hor' ich draussen vor dem Tur" | Was hör' ich draußen vor dem Tür
| data-sort-value="1815-02-01" | February1815
| data-sort-value="Text by Goethe, Johann Wolfgang von from Wilhelm Meister's Apprenticeship, Was hor ich draussen vor dem Tur" | Text by Goethe, from Wilhelm Meister's Apprenticeship; Two versions: 2nd is Op. posth. 117, AGA switches 1st and 2nd
|-
| 150
| 150
| data-sort-value="XXX,1830" | (1830)
| data-sort-value="2002,044" | XX, 2No. 44
| data-sort-value="407,26" | IV, 7 No. 26
| Lodas Gespenst
| data-sort-value="text Der bleiche, kalte Mond erhob sich im Osten" | Der bleiche, kalte Mond erhob sich im Osten
| data-sort-value="1816-01-17" | 17/1/1816
| data-sort-value="Text by Macpherson, James (Ossian) from Carric-thura, Der bleiche, kalte Mond erhob sich im Osten" | Text by Macpherson (Ossian), from Carric-thura, transl. by E. Baron de Harold; 1st ed. replaces end by music from 
|-
| 151
| 151
| data-sort-value="XXX,1850-2" | (1850)
| data-sort-value="2002,039" | XX, 2No. 39
| data-sort-value="407,27" | IV, 7 No. 27
| Auf einen Kirchhof
| data-sort-value="text Sei gegrusst, geweihte Stille" | Sei gegrüßt, geweihte Stille
| data-sort-value="1815-02-02" | 2/2/1815
| data-sort-value="Text by Schlechta, Franz Xaver von, Sei gegrusst, geweihte Stille"| Text by 
|-
| 152
| 152
| data-sort-value="XXX,1894" | (1894)
| data-sort-value="2002,040" | XX, 2No. 40
| data-sort-value="407,28" | IV, 7 No. 28
| Minona
| data-sort-value="text Wie treiben die Wolken so finster und schwer" | Wie treiben die Wolken so finster und schwer
| data-sort-value="1815-02-08" | 8/2/1815
| data-sort-value="Text by Bertrand, Friedrich Anton Franz, Wie treiben die Wolken so finster und schwer" | Text by 
|-
| 153
| 153
| data-sort-value="XXX,1845" | (1845)
| data-sort-value="2002,041" | XX, 2No. 41
| data-sort-value="407,29" | IV, 7 No. 29
| data-sort-value="Als ich sie erroten sah" | Als ich sie erröten sah
| data-sort-value="text All mein Wirken, all mein Leben" | All mein Wirken, all mein Leben
| data-sort-value="1815-02-10" | 10/2/1815
| data-sort-value="Text by Ehrlich, Bernhard Ambros, All mein Wirken, all mein Leben" | Text by 
|-
| 154
| 154
| data-sort-value="XXX,1897" | (1897)
| data-sort-value="2102,008" | XXI, 2No. 8
| data-sort-value="721,91" | VII/2, 1Anh. No. 1
| Piano Sonata, D 154
| data-sort-value="key E major" | E major
| data-sort-value="1815-02-11" | 11/2/1815
| Allegro (fragment); Partly reused in 
|-
| 155
| 155
| data-sort-value="165,1862-3" | 165p,3(1862)
| data-sort-value="2002,042" | XX, 2No. 42
| data-sort-value="407,30" | IV, 7 No. 30
| data-sort-value="Bild, Das" | Das Bild
| data-sort-value="text Ein Madchen ist's" | Ein Mädchen ist's
| data-sort-value="1815-02-10" | 10/2/1815
| data-sort-value="ZZZZ" |
|-
| 156
| 156
| data-sort-value="XXX,1887" | (1887)
| data-sort-value="1100,006" | XI No. 6
| data-sort-value="724,00" | VII/2, 4& Anh.
| data-sort-value="Variations, 10, D 156" | Ten Variations, D 156
| data-sort-value="key F major" | F major
| data-sort-value="1815-02-15" | completed15/2/1815
| For piano; Variant of Theme and Var. II
|-
| 157
| 157
| data-sort-value="XXX,1888" | (1888)
| data-sort-value="1000,001" | X No. 1
| data-sort-value="721,01" | VII/2, 1No. 1
| Piano Sonata, D 157
| data-sort-value="key E major" | E major
| data-sort-value="1815-02-18" | started18/2/1815
| Allegro ma non troppo (partly reuses ) – Andante – Minuet
|-
| 158
| 158
| data-sort-value="XXX,1889" | (1889)
| data-sort-value="1200,029" | XIINo. 29
| data-sort-value="726,00" | VII/2, 6
| data-sort-value="Ecossaise, D 158" | Écossaise, D 158
| data-sort-value="key D minor F major" | D minor – F major
| data-sort-value="1815-02-21" | 21/2/1815
| For piano
|-
| 159
| 159
| data-sort-value="116,1829" | 116p(1829)(1968)
| data-sort-value="2002,046" | XX, 2No. 46
| data-sort-value="407,31" | IV, 7 No. 31
| data-sort-value="Erwartung, Die" | Die Erwartung
| data-sort-value="text Hor' ich das Pfortchen nicht gehen?" | Hör' ich das Pförtchen nicht gehen?
| data-sort-value="1816-05-01" | May 1816
| data-sort-value="Text by Schiller, Friedrich, Hor' ich das Pfortchen nicht gehen?" | Text by Schiller; Two versions: 2nd, in AGA, is Op. posth. 116
|-
| 160
| 160
| data-sort-value="XXX,1894" | (1894)
| data-sort-value="2002,047" | XX, 2No. 47
| data-sort-value="413,00" | IV, 13
| Am Flusse, D 160
| data-sort-value="text Verfliesset, vielgeliebte Lieder 1" | Verfließet, vielgeliebte Lieder
| data-sort-value="1815-02-27" | 27/2/1815
| data-sort-value="Text by Goethe, Johann Wolfgang von, Verfliesset vielgeliebte Lieder 1" | Text by Goethe
|-
| 161
| 161
| data-sort-value="019,1825-2" | 19,2(1825)(1894)
| data-sort-value="2002,048" | XX, 2No. 48
| data-sort-value="401,0192" | IV, 1a &b No. 14
| An Mignon
| data-sort-value="text Uber Tal und Fluss getragen" | Über Tal und Fluß getragen
| data-sort-value="1815-02-27" | 27/2/1815
| data-sort-value="Text by Goethe, Johann Wolfgang von, Uber Tal und Fluss getragen" | Text by Goethe; Two versions: 2nd is Op. 19 No. 2
|-
| 162
| 162
| data-sort-value="005,1821-2" | 5,2(1821)(1894)
| data-sort-value="2002,049" | XX, 2No. 49
| data-sort-value="401,0052" | IV, 1a &Anh. No. 2
| data-sort-value="Nahe des Geliebten" | Nähe des Geliebten
| data-sort-value="text Ich denke dein, wenn mir der Sonne Schimmer" | Ich denke dein, wenn mir der Sonne Schimmer
| data-sort-value="1815-02-27" | 27/2/1815
| data-sort-value="Text by Goethe, Johann Wolfgang von, Ich denke dein, wenn mir der Sonne Schimmer" | Text by Goethe; Two versions: 2nd is Op. 5 No. 2
|-
| 163
| 163
| data-sort-value="XXX,1894" | (1894)
| data-sort-value="2002,050" | XX, 2No. 50
| data-sort-value="408,01" | IV, 8No. 1
| data-sort-value="Sangers Morgenlied, D 163" | Sängers Morgenlied, D 163
| data-sort-value="text Susses Licht! Aus goldnen Pforten, 1" | Süßes Licht! Aus goldnen Pforten
| data-sort-value="1815-02-27" | 27/2/1815
| data-sort-value="Text by Korner, Theodor, Susses Licht! Aus goldnen Pforten, 1" | Text by Körner
|-
| 164
| 164
| data-sort-value="ZZZZ" |
| data-sort-value="ZZZZ" |
| data-sort-value="408,91" | IV, 8Anh. No. 1
| Liebesrausch, D 164
| data-sort-value="text Glanz des Guten und des Schonen strahlt mir dein hohes Bild 1" | Glanz des Guten und des Schönen strahlt mir dein hohes Bild
| data-sort-value="1815-03-01" | March 1815
| data-sort-value="Text by Korner, Theodor, Glanz des Guten und des Schonen strahlt mir dein hohes Bild 1" | Text by Körner; Fragment
|-
| 165
| 165
| data-sort-value="XXX,1872" | (1872)
| data-sort-value="2002,051" | XX, 2No. 51
| data-sort-value="408,02" | IV, 8No. 2
| data-sort-value="Sangers Morgenlied, D 165" | Sängers Morgenlied, D 165
| data-sort-value="text Susses Licht! Aus goldnen Pforten, 2" | Süßes Licht! Aus goldnen Pforten
| data-sort-value="1815-03-01" | 1/3/1815
| data-sort-value="Text by Korner, Theodor, Susses Licht! Aus goldnen Pforten, 2" | Text by Körner
|-
| 166
| 166
| data-sort-value="XXX,1894" | (1894)
| data-sort-value="2002,052" | XX, 2No. 52
| data-sort-value="408,03" | IV, 8No. 3
| Amphiaraos
| data-sort-value="text Vor Thebens siebenfach gahnenden Toren" | Vor Thebens siebenfach gähnenden Toren
| data-sort-value="1815-03-01" | 1/3/1815
| data-sort-value="Text by Korner, Theodor, Vor Thebens siebenfach gahnenden Toren" | Text by Körner
|-
| 167
| 167
| data-sort-value="XXX,1846" | (1846)
| data-sort-value="1301,002" | XIII, 1No. 2
| data-sort-value="101,02" | I, 1b
| Mass No. 2
| data-sort-value="key G major" | G majorKyrie – Gloria – Credo – Sanctus & Benedictus – Agnus Dei
| data-sort-value="1815-03-07" | 2/3/1815–7/3/1815
| data-sort-value="Text: Mass ordinary 08" | Text: Mass ordinary (other settings: , 31, 45, 49, 56, 66, 105, 324, 452, 678, 755 and 950); For stbSATB and orchestra; Tr and Ti added by Ferd. Schubert; R. Führer as composer in 1st publ.
|-
| 168
| 168
| data-sort-value="XXX,1872" | (1872)
| data-sort-value="1700,016" | XVIINo. 16
| data-sort-value="302,02" | III, 2aNo. 2
| data-sort-value="Nun lasst uns den Leib begraben" | Nun laßt uns den Leib begraben, a.k.a. Begräbnislied
| data-sort-value="text Begrabt den Leib in seiner Gruft" | Begrabt den Leib in seiner Gruft
| data-sort-value="1815-03-09" | 9/3/1815
| data-sort-value="Text by Klopstock, Friedrich Gottlieb, Begrabt den Leib in seiner Gruft" | Text by Klopstock; For SATB and piano
|-
| 987
| data-sort-value="168.1" | 168A
| data-sort-value="XXX,1872" | (1872)
| data-sort-value="1700,017" | XVIINo. 17
| data-sort-value="302,03" | III, 2aNo. 3
| data-sort-value="Jesus Christus unser Heiland, der den Tod uberwand" | Jesus Christus unser Heiland, der den Tod überwand, a.k.a. Osterlied
| data-sort-value="text Uberwunden hat der Herr den Tod!" | Überwunden hat der Herr den Tod!
| data-sort-value="1815-03-09" | 9/3/1815
| data-sort-value="Text by Klopstock, Friedrich Gottlieb, Uberwunden hat der Herr den Tod!" | Text by Klopstock; For SATB and piano
|-
| 169
| 169
| data-sort-value="XXX,1894" | (1894)
| data-sort-value="2002,053" | XX, 2No. 53
| data-sort-value="303,10" | III, 3 No. 10Anh. I No. 1
| Trinklied vor der Schlacht
| data-sort-value="text Schlacht, du brichst an!" | Schlacht, du brichst an!
| data-sort-value="1815-03-12" | 12/3/1815
| data-sort-value="Text by Korner, Theodor, Schlacht, du brichst an!" | Text by Körner; For double unison choir and piano
|-
| 170
| 170
| data-sort-value="XXX,1873" | (1873)
| data-sort-value="2002,054" | XX, 2No. 54
| data-sort-value="303,11" | III, 3 No. 11
| Schwertlied
| data-sort-value="text Du Schwert an meiner Linken" | Du Schwert an meiner Linken
| data-sort-value="1815-03-12" | 12/3/1815
| data-sort-value="Text by Korner, Theodor, Du Schwert an meiner Linken" | Text by Körner; For voice, unison choir and piano
|-
| 171
| 171
| data-sort-value="XXX,1831" | (1831)
| data-sort-value="2002,055" | XX, 2No. 55
| data-sort-value="408,04" | IV, 8No. 4
| data-sort-value="Gebet wahrend der Schlacht" | Gebet während der Schlacht
| data-sort-value="text Vater, ich rufe dich!" | Vater, ich rufe dich!
| data-sort-value="1815-03-12" | 12/3/1815
| data-sort-value="Text by Korner, Theodor, Vater, ich rufe dich!" | Text by Körner
|-
| 172
| 172
| data-sort-value="ZZZZ" |
| data-sort-value="ZZZZ" |
| data-sort-value="408,93" | IV, 8Anh. No. 3
| data-sort-value="Morgenstern, Der, D 172" | Der Morgenstern, D 172
| data-sort-value="text Stern der Liebe, Glanzgebilde 1" | Stern der Liebe, Glanzgebilde
| data-sort-value="1815-03-12" | 12/3/1815
| data-sort-value="Text by Korner, Theodor, Stern der Liebe, Glanzgebilde 1" | Text by Körner; Fragment
|-
| 173
| 173
| data-sort-value="XXX,1871" | (1871)
| data-sort-value="0500,009" | V No. 9
| data-sort-value="604,11" | VI, 4No. 11
| data-sort-value="String Quartet, D 173" | String Quartet No. 9
| data-sort-value="key G minor" | G minor
| data-sort-value="1815-04-01" | 25/3/1815–1/4/1815
| Allegro con brio – Andantino – Minuet – Allegro
|-
| 174
| 174
| data-sort-value="XXX,1845" | (1845)
| data-sort-value="2002,056" | XX, 2No. 56
| data-sort-value="408,05" | IV, 8No. 5
| Das war ich, D 174
| data-sort-value="text Jungst traumte mir" | Jüngst träumte mir
| data-sort-value="1815-03-26" | 26/3/1815
| data-sort-value="Text by Korner, Theodor, Jungst traumte mir" | Text by Körner; D. 174 used to include Das war ich, D deest
|- id="Das war ich, D deest"
| 174
| data-sort-value="999.09990174" | deest
| data-sort-value="XXX,1894" | (1894)
| data-sort-value="2211,056" | XXII, 11No. 56
| data-sort-value="408,92" | IV, 8Anh. No. 2
| data-sort-value="Das war ich, D deest" | Das war ich, D deest
| data-sort-value="ZZZZ" |
| data-sort-value="1816-06-01" | June 1816
| Fragment; Music without text, title identical to 
|-
| 175
| 175
| data-sort-value="XXX,1888" | (1888)
| data-sort-value="1400,012" | XIVNo. 12
| data-sort-value="109,001" | I, 9No. 1
| data-sort-value="Stabat Mater, D 175" | Stabat Mater, D 175
| data-sort-value="key G minor" | G minorStabat Mater dolorosa
| data-sort-value="1815-04-06" | 4/4/1815–6/4/1815
| For SATB and orchestra
|-
| 176
| 176
| data-sort-value="XXX,1872" | (1872)
| data-sort-value="2002,057" | XX, 2No. 57
| data-sort-value="408,06" | IV, 8No. 6
| data-sort-value="Sterne, Die, D 176" | Die Sterne, D 176
| data-sort-value="text Was funkelt ihr so mild mich an" | Was funkelt ihr so mild mich an
| data-sort-value="1815-04-06" | 6/4/1815
| data-sort-value="Text by Fellinger, Johann Georg, Was funkelt ihr so mild mich an" | Text by 
|-
| 177
| 177
| data-sort-value="173,1867-3" | 173p,3(1867)
| data-sort-value="2002,058" | XX, 2No. 58
| data-sort-value="408,07" | IV, 8No. 7
| data-sort-value="Vergebliche Liebe" | Vergebliche Liebe
| data-sort-value="text Ja, ich weiss es, diese treue Liebe" | Ja, ich weiß es, diese treue Liebe
| data-sort-value="1815-04-06" | 6/4/1815
| data-sort-value="Text by Bernard, Joseph Karl, Ja, ich weiss es, diese treue Liebe"| Text by Bernard
|-
| data-sort-value="999.01771" |
| data-sort-value="177.1" | 177A
| data-sort-value="ZZZZ" |
| data-sort-value="ZZZZ" |
| data-sort-value="803,01" | VIII, 3
| Am ersten Mai
| data-sort-value="text Ich ging mit ihr im Freien" | Ich ging mit ihr im Freien
| data-sort-value="1820-12-31" | before1821
| data-sort-value="Text by Bernard, Joseph Karl, Ja, ich weiss es, diese treue Liebe"| Text by Bernard; Music lost; Spurious?
|-
| 178
| 178
| data-sort-value="XXX,1897" | (1897)
| data-sort-value="2103,022" | XXI, 3No. 22
| data-sort-value="724,00" | VII/2, 4& Anh.
| data-sort-value="Adagio in G major, D 178" | Adagio in G major, D 178
| data-sort-value="key G major" | G major
| data-sort-value="1815-04-08" | 8/4/1815
| For piano; Two versions: 2nd is a fragment
|-
| 179
| 179
| data-sort-value="XXX,1872" | (1872)
| data-sort-value="2002,059" | XX, 2No. 59
| data-sort-value="408,08" | IV, 8No. 8
| Liebesrausch, D 179
| data-sort-value="text Dir, Madchen, schlagt mit leisem Beben 2" | Dir, Mädchen, schlägt mit leisem Beben
| data-sort-value="1815-04-08" | 8/4/1815
| data-sort-value="Text by Korner, Theodor, Dir, Madchen, schlagt mit leisem Beben 2" | Text by Körner; 
|-
| 180
| 180
| data-sort-value="XXX,1894" | (1894)
| data-sort-value="2002,060" | XX, 2No. 60
| data-sort-value="408,09" | IV, 8No. 9
| Sehnsucht der Liebe
| data-sort-value="text Wie die Nacht mit heil'gem Beben" | Wie die Nacht mit heil'gem Beben
| data-sort-value="1815-04-08" | 8/4/1815
| data-sort-value="Text by Korner, Theodor, Wie die Nacht mit heil'gem Beben" | Text by Körner
|-
| 181
| 181
| data-sort-value="XXX,1888" | (1888)
| data-sort-value="1400,004" | XIV No. 4
| data-sort-value="109,002" | I, 9No. 2
| data-sort-value="Offertory, D 181" | Offertory, D 181
| data-sort-value="text Tres sunt, qui testimonium dant in coelo" | Tres sunt, qui testimonium dant in coeloA minor
| data-sort-value="1815-04-11" | 10/4/1815–11/4/1815
| For SATB and orchestra
|-
| 182
| 182
| data-sort-value="XXX,1842" | (1842)
| data-sort-value="2002,061" | XX, 2No. 61
| data-sort-value="408,10" | IV, 8No. 10
| data-sort-value="Erste Liebe, Die" | Die erste Liebe
| data-sort-value="text Die erste Liebe fullt das Herz" | Die erste Liebe füllt das Herz
| data-sort-value="1815-04-12" | 12/4/1815
| data-sort-value="Text by Fellinger, Johann Georg, Die erste Liebe fullt das Herz" | Text by 
|-
| 183
| 183
| data-sort-value="XXX,1887" | (1887)
| data-sort-value="2002,062" | XX, 2No. 62
| data-sort-value="303,12" | III, 3 No. 12
| data-sort-value="Trinklied, D 183" | Trinklied, D 183
| data-sort-value="text Ihr Freunde und du, gold'ner Wein" | Ihr Freunde und du, gold'ner Wein
| data-sort-value="1815-04-12" | 12/4/1815
|-
| 184
| 184
| data-sort-value="150,1843" | 150p(1843)
| data-sort-value="1400,005" | XIV No. 5
| data-sort-value="109,003" | I, 9No. 3
| data-sort-value="Gradual, D 184" | Gradual, D 184
| data-sort-value="text Benedictus es, Domine" | Benedictus es, DomineC major
| data-sort-value="1815-04-07" | 15/4/1815–17/4/1815
| For SATB and orchestra
|-
| 185
| data-sort-value="999.0105" | 105
| data-sort-value="ZZZZ" |

| data-sort-value="ZZZZ" |

| data-sort-value="ZZZZ" |

| data-sort-value="ZZZZ" |

| data-sort-value="ZZZZ" |

| data-sort-value="ZZZZ" |

| See 
|-
| 186
| 186
| data-sort-value="XXX,1894" | (1894)
| data-sort-value="2002,065" | XX, 2No. 65
| data-sort-value="408,11" | IV, 8No. 11
| data-sort-value="Sterbende, Die" | Die Sterbende
| data-sort-value="text Heil! dies ist die letze Zahre" | Heil! dies ist die letze Zähre
| data-sort-value="1815-05-01" | May 1815
| data-sort-value="Text by Matthisson, Friedrich von, Heil! dies ist die letze Zahre" | Text by Matthisson
|-
| 187
| 187
| data-sort-value="XXX,1894" | (1894)
| data-sort-value="2002,063" | XX, 2No. 63
| data-sort-value="410,00" | IV, 10
| Stimme der Liebe, D 187
| data-sort-value="text Abendgewolke schweben hell 1" | Abendgewölke schweben hell
| data-sort-value="1815-05-01" | May 1815
| data-sort-value="Text by Matthisson, Friedrich von, Abendgewolke schweben hell 1" | Text by Matthisson
|-
| 188
| 188
| data-sort-value="XXX,1887" | (1887)
| data-sort-value="2002,064" | XX, 2No. 64
| data-sort-value="408,12" | IV, 8No. 12
| data-sort-value="Naturgenuss, D 188" | Naturgenuß, D 188
| data-sort-value="text Im Abendschimmer wallt der Quell 1" | Im Abendschimmer wallt der Quell
| data-sort-value="1815-05-01" | May 1815
| data-sort-value="Text by Matthisson, Friedrich von, Im Abendschimmer wallt der Quell 1" | Text by Matthisson
|-
| 189
| 189
| data-sort-value="111,1829" | 111p,1(1829)
| data-sort-value="2002,066" | XX, 2No. 66
| data-sort-value="303,13" | III, 3 No. 13
| An die Freude
| data-sort-value="text Freude, schoner Gotterfunken" | Freude, schöner Götterfunken
| data-sort-value="1815-05-01" | May 1815
| data-sort-value="Text by Schiller, Friedrich, Freude, schoner Gotterfunken" | Text by Schiller; For voice, unison choir and piano
|-
| 190
| 190
| data-sort-value="XXX,1888" | (1888)
| data-sort-value="1502,002" | XV, 2No. 2
| data-sort-value="202,01" | II, 2IV, 14
| data-sort-value="Vierjahrige Posten, Der" | Der vierjährige Posten
| data-sort-value="theatre (Singspiel in 1 act)" | (Singspiel in one act)Includes: 5. Gott! Gott! höre meine Stimme
| data-sort-value="1815-05-19" | 8/5/1815–19/5/1815
| data-sort-value="Text by Korner, Theodor, Vierjahrige Posten, Der" | Text by Körner; Music for stttbSATB and orchestra; Overture – Nos. 1–8 (No. 5 also for voice and piano)
|-
| 191
| 191
| data-sort-value="058,1826-3" | 58,3(1826)(1894)
| data-sort-value="2002,067" | XX, 2No. 67
| data-sort-value="403,00" | IV, 3
| data-sort-value="Madchens Klage, Des, D 191" | Des Mädchens Klage, D 191
| data-sort-value="text Der Eichwald brauset 2" | Der Eichwald brauset
| data-sort-value="1815-05-15" | 15/5/1815
| data-sort-value="Text by Schiller, Friedrich from Wallenstein: Die Piccolomini III, 7 Der Eichwald brauset 2" | Text by Schiller, from Wallenstein: Die Piccolomini III, 7 (other settings:  and 389); Two versions: 2nd is Op. 58 No. 3
|-
| 192
| 192
| data-sort-value="XXX,1887" | (1887)
| data-sort-value="2002,068" | XX, 2No. 68
| data-sort-value="404,00" | IV, 4
| data-sort-value="Jungling am Bache, Der, D 192" | Der Jüngling am Bache, D 192
| data-sort-value="text An der Quelle sass der Knabe 2" | An der Quelle saß der Knabe
| data-sort-value="1815-05-15" | 15/5/1815
| data-sort-value="Text by Schiller, Friedrich, An der Quelle sass der Knabe 2" | Text by Schiller (other settings:  and 638)
|-
| 193
| 193
| data-sort-value="057,1826-3 | 57,3(1826)
| data-sort-value="2002,069" | XX, 2No. 69
| data-sort-value="403,00" | IV, 3
| An den Mond, D 193
| data-sort-value="text Geuss, lieber Mond, geuss deine Silberflimmer" | Geuß, lieber Mond, geuß deine Silberflimmer
| data-sort-value="1815-05-17" | 17/5/1815
| data-sort-value="Text by Holty, Ludwig Heinrich Christoph, Geuss, lieber Mond, geuss deine Silberflimmer 1" | Text by Hölty; Autograph without piano intro
|-
| 194
| 194
| data-sort-value="XXX,1894" | (1894)
| data-sort-value="2002,070" | XX, 2No. 70
| data-sort-value="408,13" | IV, 8No. 13
| data-sort-value="Mainacht, Die" | Die Mainacht
| data-sort-value="text Wann der silberne Mond" | Wann der silberne Mond
| data-sort-value="1815-05-17" | 17/5/1815
| data-sort-value="Text by Holty, Ludwig Heinrich Christoph, Wann der silberne Mond" | Text by Hölty
|-
| 195
| 195
| data-sort-value="173,1867-1" | 173p,1(1867)
| data-sort-value="2002,071" | XX, 2No. 71
| data-sort-value="408,14" | IV, 8No. 14
| Amalia
| data-sort-value="text Schon wie Engel voll Walhallas Wonne" | Schön wie Engel voll Walhallas Wonne
| data-sort-value="1815-05-19" | 19/5/1815
| data-sort-value="Text by Schiller, Friedrich from Rauber, Die III,1 | Text by Schiller, from Die Räuber III, 1
|-
| 196
| 196
| data-sort-value="172,1865-3" | 172p,3(1865)
| data-sort-value="2002,072" | XX, 2No. 72
| data-sort-value="408,15" | IV, 8No. 15
| An die Nachtigall
| data-sort-value="text Geuss nicht so laut der liebentflammten Lieder" | Geuß nicht so laut der liebentflammten Lieder
| data-sort-value="1815-05-22" | 22/5/1815
| data-sort-value="Text by Holty, Ludwig Heinrich Christoph, Geuss nicht so laut der liebentflammten Lieder" | Text by Hölty
|-
| 197
| 197
| data-sort-value="XXX,1850" | (1850)
| data-sort-value="2002,073" | XX, 2No. 73
| data-sort-value="408,16" | IV, 8No. 16
| data-sort-value="An die Apfelbaume, wo ich Julien erblickte" | An die Apfelbäume, wo ich Julien erblickte
| data-sort-value="text Ein heilig Sauseln und ein Gesangeston" | Ein heilig Säuseln und ein Gesangeston
| data-sort-value="1815-05-22" | 22/5/1815
| data-sort-value="Text by Holty, Ludwig Heinrich Christoph, Ein heilig Sauseln und ein Gesangeston" | Text by Hölty
|-
| 198
| 198
| data-sort-value="XXX,1894" | (1894)
| data-sort-value="2002,074" | XX, 2No. 74
| data-sort-value="408,17" | IV, 8No. 17
| Seufzer
| data-sort-value="text Die Nachtigall singt uberall" | Die Nachtigall singt überall
| data-sort-value="1815-05-22" | 22/5/1815
| data-sort-value="Text by Holty, Ludwig Heinrich Christoph, Die Nachtigall singt uberall" | Text by Hölty
|-
| 199
| 199
| data-sort-value="XXX,1885" | (1885)
| data-sort-value="1900,030" | XIXNo. 30
| data-sort-value="304,22" | III, 4No. 22
| Mailied, D 199
| data-sort-value="text Gruner wird die Au 2" | Grüner wird die Au
| data-sort-value="1815-05-24" | 24/5/1815
| data-sort-value="Text by Holty, Ludwig Heinrich Christoph, Gruner wird die Au 2" | Text by Hölty (other settings:  and 503); For two voices or two horns
|-
| 200
| 200
| data-sort-value="XXX,1884" | (1884)
| data-sort-value="0101,003" | I, 1No. 3
| data-sort-value="501,03" | V, 1No. 3
| data-sort-value="Symphony No. 03" | Symphony No. 3
| data-sort-value="key D major" | D major
| data-sort-value="1815-06-19" | 24/5/1815–19/6/1815
| Adagio maestoso, Allegro con brio – Allegretto – Minuet – Presto vivace
|-
| 201
| 201
| data-sort-value="XXX,1970" | (1970)
| data-sort-value="ZZZZ" |
| data-sort-value="410,00" | IV, 10
| Auf den Tod einer Nachtigall, D 201
| data-sort-value="text Sie ist dahin, die Maienlieder tonte 1" | Sie ist dahin, die Maienlieder tönte
| data-sort-value="1815-05-25" | 25/5/1815
| data-sort-value="Text by Holty, Ludwig Heinrich Christoph, Sie ist dahin, die Maienlieder tonte 1" | Text by Hölty; Fragment
|-
| 202
| 202
| data-sort-value="XXX,1885" | (1885)
| data-sort-value="1900,031" | XIXNo. 31
| data-sort-value="304,23" | III, 4No. 23
| Mailied, D 202
| data-sort-value="text Der Schnee Zerrinnt 2" | Der Schnee Zerrinnt
| data-sort-value="1815-05-26" | 26/5/1815
| data-sort-value="Text by Holty, Ludwig Heinrich Christoph, Der Schnee Zerrinnt 2" | Text by Hölty; For two voices or two horns
|-
| 203
| 203
| data-sort-value="XXX,1892" | (1892)
| data-sort-value="1900,032" | XIXNo. 32
| data-sort-value="304,24" | III, 4No. 24
| data-sort-value="Morgenstern, Der, D 203" | Der Morgenstern, D 203
| data-sort-value="text Stern der Liebe, Glanzgebilde 2" | Stern der Liebe, Glanzgebilde
| data-sort-value="1815-05-26" | 26/5/1815
| data-sort-value="Text by Korner, Theodor, Stern der Liebe, Glanzgebilde 2" | Text by Körner; For two voices or two horns
|-
| 204
| 204
| data-sort-value="XXX,1892" | (1892)
| data-sort-value="1900,033" | XIXNo. 33
| data-sort-value="304,25" | III, 4No. 25
| data-sort-value="Jagerlied" | Jägerlied
| data-sort-value="text Frisch auf, ihr Jager" | Frisch auf, ihr Jäger
| data-sort-value="1815-05-26" | 26/5/1815
| data-sort-value="Text by Korner, Theodor, Frisch auf, ihr Jager" | Text by Körner; For two voices or two horns
|-
| data-sort-value="999.02041" |
| data-sort-value="204.1" | 204A
| data-sort-value="ZZZZ" |
| data-sort-value="ZZZZ" |
| data-sort-value="408,94" | IV, 8Anh. No. 4
| data-sort-value="Traumbild, Das" | Das Traumbild
| data-sort-value="ZZZZ" |
| data-sort-value="1815-05-01" | May 1815
| data-sort-value="Text by Holty, Ludwig Heinrich Christoph; Music lost" | Text by Hölty; Music lost
|-
| 205
| 205
| data-sort-value="XXX,1892" | (1892)
| data-sort-value="1900,034" | XIXNo. 34
| data-sort-value="304,26" | III, 4No. 26
| data-sort-value="Lutzows wilde Jagd" | Lützows wilde Jagd
| data-sort-value="text Was glanzt dort vom Walde im Sonnenschein?" | Was glänzt dort vom Walde im Sonnenschein?
| data-sort-value="1815-05-26" | 26/5/1815
| data-sort-value="Text by Korner, Theodor, Was glanzt dort vom Walde im Sonnenschein?" | Text by Körner; For two voices or two horns
|-
| 206
| 206
| data-sort-value="XXX,1872" | (1872)
| data-sort-value="2002,075" | XX, 2No. 75
| data-sort-value="408,18" | IV, 8No. 18
| data-sort-value="Liebestandelei" | Liebeständelei
| data-sort-value="text Susses Liebchen" | Süßes Liebchen
| data-sort-value="1815-05-26" | 26/5/1815
| data-sort-value="Text by Korner, Theodor, Susses Liebchen" | Text by Körner
|-
| 207
| 207
| data-sort-value="XXX,1894" | (1894)
| data-sort-value="2002,076" | XX, 2No. 76
| data-sort-value="408,19" | IV, 8No. 19
| data-sort-value="Liebende, Der" | Der Liebende
| data-sort-value="text Begluckt, begluckt" | Beglückt, beglückt
| data-sort-value="1815-05-29" | 29/5/1815
| data-sort-value="Text by Holty, Ludwig Heinrich Christoph, Begluckt, begluckt" | Text by Hölty
|-
| data-sort-value="208" | 208212
| 208
| data-sort-value="XXX,1895" | (1895)(1897)
| data-sort-value="2002,077" | XX, 2No. 77;XXII, 11No. 77
| data-sort-value="408,20" | IV, 8 No. 20 & Anh. No. 5
| data-sort-value="Nonne, Die" | Die Nonne
| data-sort-value="text Es liebt' in Welschland irgendwo" | Es liebt' in Welschland irgendwo
| data-sort-value="1815-05-29" | 29/5/1815
| data-sort-value="Text by Holty, Ludwig Heinrich Christoph, Balladen, No. 5; 2 versions" | Text by Hölty, from Balladen, No. 5; Two versions: 1st is fragment, incomplete in AGA – 2nd was 
|-
| 209
| 209
| data-sort-value="038,1825" | 38(1825)
| data-sort-value="2002,098" | XX, 2No. 98
| data-sort-value="402,0380" | IV, 2a
| data-sort-value="Liedler, Der" | Der Liedler
| data-sort-value="text Gib, Schwester, mir die Harf herab" | Gib, Schwester, mir die Harf herab
| data-sort-value="1815-01-01" | January 1815
| data-sort-value="Text by Kenner, Joseph, Gib, Schwester, mir die Harf herab" | Text by Kenner
|-
| 210
| 210
| data-sort-value="XXX,1838" | (1838)
| data-sort-value="2002,078" | XX, 2No. 78
| data-sort-value="408,21" | IV, 8 No. 21
| data-sort-value="Liebe, Die, D 210" | Die Liebe, D 210, a.k.a. Klärchens Lied
| data-sort-value="text Freudvoll und leidvoll" | Freudvoll und leidvoll
| data-sort-value="1815-06-03" | 3/6/1815
| data-sort-value="Text by Goethe, Johann Wolfgang von from Egmont, Act III, Scene 2, Clarchen's song" | Text by Goethe, from Egmont, Act III, Scene 2, Clärchen's song
|-
| 211
| 211
| data-sort-value="XXX,1894" | (1894)
| data-sort-value="2002,079" | XX, 2No. 79
| data-sort-value="408,22" | IV, 8 No. 22
| Adelwold und Emma
| data-sort-value="text Hoch und ehern schier von Dauer" | Hoch und ehern schier von Dauer
| data-sort-value="1815-06-14" | 5/6/1815–14/6/1815
| data-sort-value="Text by Bertrand, Friedrich Anton Franz, Hoch und ehern schier von Dauer" | Text by 
|-
| 212
| data-sort-value="999.0208" | 208
| data-sort-value="ZZZZ" |

| data-sort-value="ZZZZ" |

| data-sort-value="ZZZZ" |

| data-sort-value="ZZZZ" |

| data-sort-value="ZZZZ" |

| data-sort-value="ZZZZ" |

| See 
|-
| 213
| 213
| data-sort-value="172,1865-1" | 172p,1(1865)
| data-sort-value="2002,080" | XX, 2No. 80
| data-sort-value="408,23" | IV, 8 No. 23
| data-sort-value="Traum, Der" | Der Traum
| data-sort-value="text Mir traumt', ich war ein Vogelein" | Mir träumt', ich war ein Vögelein
| data-sort-value="1815-06-17" | 17/6/1815
| data-sort-value="Text by Holty, Ludwig Heinrich Christoph from Balladen, No. 6" | Text by Hölty, from Balladen, No. 6
|-
| 214
| 214
| data-sort-value="172,1865-2" | 172p,2(1865)
| data-sort-value="2002,081" | XX, 2No. 81
| data-sort-value="408,24" | IV, 8 No. 24
| data-sort-value="Laube, Die" | Die Laube
| data-sort-value="text Nimmer werd' ich, nimmer dein vergessen" | Nimmer werd' ich, nimmer dein vergessen
| data-sort-value="1815-06-17" | 17/6/1815
| data-sort-value="Text by Holty, Ludwig Heinrich Christoph, Nimmer werd' ich, nimmer dein vergessen" | Text by Hölty
|-
| 215
| 215
| data-sort-value="XXX,1906" | (1906)
| data-sort-value="ZZZZ" |
| data-sort-value="401,1034" | IV, 1b No. 4
| data-sort-value="Jagers Abendlied, D 215" | Jägers Abendlied, D 215
| data-sort-value="text Im Felde schleich ich, still und wild 1" | Im Felde schleich ich, still und wild
| data-sort-value="1815-06-20" | 20/6/1815
| data-sort-value="Text by Goethe, Johann Wolfgang von, Im Felde schleich ich, still und wild 1" | Text by Goethe
|-
| data-sort-value="216.01" | 216
| data-sort-value="215.1" | 215A
| data-sort-value="XXX,1952" | (1952)
| data-sort-value="ZZZZ" |
| data-sort-value="401,0032" | IV, 1a &b No. 3
| Meeres Stille, D 215A
| data-sort-value="text Tiefe Stille herrscht im Wasser 1" | Tiefe Stille herrscht im Wasser
| data-sort-value="1815-06-20" | 20/6/1815
| data-sort-value="Text by Goethe, Johann Wolfgang von, Tiefe Stille herrscht im Wasser 1" | Text by Goethe
|-
| data-sort-value="216.02" | 216
| 216
| data-sort-value="003,1821-2" | 3,2(1821)
| data-sort-value="2002,082" | XX, 2No. 82
| data-sort-value="401,0032" | IV, 1a
| Meeres Stille, D 216
| data-sort-value="text Tiefe Stille herrscht im Wasser 2" | Tiefe Stille herrscht im Wasser
| data-sort-value="1815-06-21" | 21/6/1815
| data-sort-value="Text by Goethe, Johann Wolfgang von, Tiefe Stille herrscht im Wasser 2" | Text by Goethe
|-
| 217
| 217
| data-sort-value="XXX,1830" | (1830)
| data-sort-value="2002,083" | XX, 2No. 83
| data-sort-value="408,25" | IV, 8 No. 25
| Kolmas Klage
| data-sort-value="text Rund um mich Nacht" | Rund um mich Nacht
| data-sort-value="1815-06-22" | 22/6/1815
| data-sort-value="Text by Macpherson, James (Ossian) from The Songs of Selma, Rund um mich Nacht" | Text by Macpherson (Ossian), from The Songs of Selma (transl.)
|-
| 218
| 218
| data-sort-value="XXX,1848" | (1848)
| data-sort-value="2002,084" | XX, 2No. 84
| data-sort-value="408,26" | IV, 8 No. 26
| Grablied
| data-sort-value="text Er fiel den Tod fur's Vaterland" | Er fiel den Tod für's Vaterland
| data-sort-value="1815-06-24" | 24/6/1815
| data-sort-value="Text by Kenner, Joseph, Er fiel den Tod fur's Vaterland" | Text by Kenner
|-
| 219
| 219
| data-sort-value="XXX,1848" | (1848)
| data-sort-value="2002,085" | XX, 2No. 85
| data-sort-value="408,27" | IV, 8 No. 27
| data-sort-value="Finden, Das" | Das Finden
| data-sort-value="text Ich hab ein Madchen funden" | Ich hab ein Mädchen funden
| data-sort-value="1815-06-25" | 25/6/1815
| data-sort-value="Text by Kosegarten, Ludwig Gotthard, Ich hab ein Madchen funden" | Text by Kosegarten
|-
| 220
| 220
| data-sort-value="XXX,1888" | (1888)
| data-sort-value="1502,003" | XV, 2No. 3
| data-sort-value="202,02" | II, 2
| data-sort-value="Fernando" | Fernando
| data-sort-value="theatre (Singspiel in 1 act)" | (Singspiel in one act)
| data-sort-value="1815-07-09" | Jun. 1815–9/7/1815
|-
| 221
| 221
| data-sort-value="118,1829-2" | 118p,2(1829)
| data-sort-value="2002,095" | XX, 2No. 95
| data-sort-value="408,28" | IV, 8 No. 28
| data-sort-value="Abend, Der, D 221" | Der Abend, D 221
| data-sort-value="text Der Abend bluht, Temora gluht" | Der Abend blüht, Temora glüht
| data-sort-value="1815-07-15" | 15/7/1815
| data-sort-value="Text by Kosegarten, Ludwig Gotthard, Der Abend bluht, Temora gluht" | Text by Kosegarten
|-
| 222
| 222
| data-sort-value="XXX,1885" | (1885)
| data-sort-value="2002,086" | XX, 2No. 86
| data-sort-value="408,29" | IV, 8 No. 29
| Lieb Minna: Romanze
| data-sort-value="text Schwuler Hauch weht mir heruber" | Schwüler Hauch weht mir herüber
| data-sort-value="1815-07-02" | 2/7/1815
| data-sort-value="Text by Stadler, Albert, Schwuler Hauch weht mir heruber" | Text by 
|-
| 223
| 223
| data-sort-value="047,1825-0" | 47(1825)
| data-sort-value="1400,002" | XIV No. 2
| data-sort-value="108,00" | I, 8
| Salve Regina, D 223, a.k.a. Offertory No. 2
| data-sort-value="key F major" | F majorSalve Regina
| data-sort-value="1823-01-23" | 5/7/181528/1/1823
| data-sort-value="Text: Salve Regina 3" | Text: Salve Regina (other settings: , 106, 386, 676 and 811); For s and orchestra; Two versions: 2nd, in AGA, is Op. 47
|-
| 224
| 224
| data-sort-value="004,1821-3" | 4,3(1821)
| data-sort-value="2002,087" | XX, 2No. 87
| data-sort-value="401,0043" | IV, 1a
| Wandrers Nachtlied, D 224
| data-sort-value="text Der du von dem Himmel bist" | Der du von dem Himmel bist
| data-sort-value="1815-07-05" | 5/7/1815
| data-sort-value="Text by Goethe, Johann Wolfgang von, Der du von dem Himmel bist" | Text by Goethe
|-
| 225
| 225
| data-sort-value="005,1821-3" | 5,3(1821)(1970)
| data-sort-value="2002,088" | XX, 2No. 88
| data-sort-value="401,0053" | IV, 1a &b No. 7
| data-sort-value="Fischer, Der" | Der Fischer
| data-sort-value="text Das Wasser rauscht', das Wasser schwoll" | Das Wasser rauscht', das Wasser schwoll
| data-sort-value="1815-07-05" | 5/7/1815
| data-sort-value="Text by Goethe, Johann Wolfgang von, Das Wasser rauscht', das Wasser schwoll" | Text by Goethe; Two versions: 2nd, in AGA, is Op. 5 No. 3
|-
| 226
| 226
| data-sort-value="005,1821-4" | 5,4(1821)
| data-sort-value="2002,089" | XX, 2No. 89
| data-sort-value="401,0054" | IV, 1a
| Erster Verlust
| data-sort-value="text Ach, wer bringt die schonen Tage" | Ach, wer bringt die schönen Tage
| data-sort-value="1815-07-05" | 5/7/1815
| data-sort-value="Text by Goethe, Johann Wolfgang von, Ach, wer bringt die schonen Tage" | Text by Goethe
|-
| 227
| 227
| data-sort-value="XXX,1885" | (1885)
| data-sort-value="2002,090" | XX, 2No. 90
| data-sort-value="408,30" | IV, 8 No. 30
| Idens Nachtgesang
| data-sort-value="text Vernimm es Nacht, was Ida dir vertrauet" | Vernimm es Nacht, was Ida dir vertrauet
| data-sort-value="1815-07-07" | 7/7/1815
| data-sort-value="Text by Kosegarten, Ludwig Gotthard, Vernimm es Nacht, was Ida dir vertrauet" | Text by Kosegarten
|-
| 228
| 228
| data-sort-value="XXX,1894" | (1894)
| data-sort-value="2002,091" | XX, 2No. 91
| data-sort-value="408,31" | IV, 8 No. 31
| Von Ida
| data-sort-value="text Der Morgen bluht, der Osten gluht" | Der Morgen blüht, der Osten glüht
| data-sort-value="1815-07-07" | 7/7/1815
| data-sort-value="Text by Kosegarten, Ludwig Gotthard, Der Morgen bluht, der Osten gluht" | Text by Kosegarten
|-
| 229
| 229
| data-sort-value="108,1824-3" | 108,3(1824)
| data-sort-value="2002,092" | XX, 2No. 92
| data-sort-value="405,00" | IV, 5
| data-sort-value="Erscheinung, Die" | Die Erscheinung, a.k.a. Erinnerung, D 229
| data-sort-value="text Ich lag auf grunen Matten" | Ich lag auf grünen Matten
| data-sort-value="1815-07-07" | 7/7/1815
| data-sort-value="Text by Kosegarten, Ludwig Gotthard, Ich lag auf grunen Matten" | Text by Kosegarten; Publ. as Op. 108 No. 3 in 1829
|-
| 230
| 230
| data-sort-value="165,1855-4" | 165p,4(1855)
| data-sort-value="2002,093" | XX, 2No. 93
| data-sort-value="408,32" | IV, 8 
| data-sort-value="Tauschung, Die" | Die Täuschung
| data-sort-value="text Im Erlenbusch, im Tannenhain" | Im Erlenbusch, im Tannenhain
| data-sort-value="1815-07-07" | 7/7/1815
| data-sort-value="Text by Kosegarten, Ludwig Gotthard, Im Erlenbusch, im Tannenhain" | Text by Kosegarten; Publ. as Op. posth. 165 No. 4 in 1862
|-
| 231
| 231
| data-sort-value="172,1865-4" | 172p,4(1865)
| data-sort-value="2002,094" | XX, 2No. 94
| data-sort-value="408,33" | IV, 8 
| data-sort-value="Sehnen, Das" | Das Sehnen
| data-sort-value="text Wehmut, die mich hullt" | Wehmut, die mich hüllt
| data-sort-value="1815-07-08" | 8/7/1815
| data-sort-value="Text by Kosegarten, Ludwig Gotthard, Wehmut, die mich hullt" | Text by Kosegarten
|-
| 232
| 232
| data-sort-value="112,1829-3" | 112p,3(1829)
| data-sort-value="1700,008" | XVIINo. 8
| data-sort-value="302,06" | III, 2a No. 62b Anh. No. 2
| Hymne an den Unendlichen
| data-sort-value="text Zwischen Himmel und Erd'" | Zwischen Himmel und Erd'
| data-sort-value="1815-07-11" | 11/7/1815
| data-sort-value="Text by Schiller, Friedrich, Zwischen Himmel und Erd'" | Text by Schiller; For satb and piano
|-
| 233
| 233
| data-sort-value="118,1829-1" | 118p,1(1829)
| data-sort-value="2002,096" | XX, 2No. 96
| data-sort-value="408,34" | IV, 8 
| Geist der Liebe, D 233
| data-sort-value="text Wer bist du, Geist der Liebe" | Wer bist du, Geist der Liebe
| data-sort-value="1815-07-15" | 15/7/1815
| data-sort-value="Text by Kosegarten, Ludwig Gotthard, Wer bist du, Geist der Liebe" | Text by Kosegarten
|-
| 234
| 234
| data-sort-value="118,1829-3" | 118p,3(1829)
| data-sort-value="2002,097" | XX, 2No. 97
| data-sort-value="408,35" | IV, 8 
| Tischlied
| data-sort-value="text Mich ergreift, ich weiss nicht wie" | Mich ergreift, ich weiß nicht wie
| data-sort-value="1815-07-15" | 15/7/1815
| data-sort-value="Text by Goethe, Johann Wolfgang von, Mich ergreift, ich weiss nicht wie" | Text by Goethe
|-
| 235
| 235
| data-sort-value="XXX,1894" | (1894)
| data-sort-value="2002,100" | XX, 2No. 100
| data-sort-value="408,36" | IV, 8 
| Abends unter der Linde, D 235
| data-sort-value="text Woher, o namenloses Sehnen 1" | Woher, o namenloses Sehnen
| data-sort-value="1815-07-24" | 24/7/1815
| data-sort-value="Text by Kosegarten, Ludwig Gotthard, Woher, o namenloses Sehnen 1" | Text by Kosegarten
|- id="D 236"
| 236
| 236
| data-sort-value="XXX,1892" | (1892)
| data-sort-value="1900,006" | XIXNo. 6
| data-sort-value="302,07" | III, 2aNo. 7
| data-sort-value="Abendrot, Das, D 236" | Das Abendrot, D 236
| data-sort-value="text Der Abend bluht, der Westen gluht!" | Der Abend blüht, der Westen glüht!
| data-sort-value="1815-07-20" | 20/7/1815
| data-sort-value="Text by Kosegarten, Ludwig Gotthard, Der Abend bluht, der Westen gluht!" | Text by Kosegarten; for ssb and piano
|-
| 237
| 237
| data-sort-value="XXX,1872" | (1872)
| data-sort-value="2002,101" | XX, 2No. 101
| data-sort-value="408,37" | IV, 8 
| Abends unter der Linde, D 237
| data-sort-value="text Woher, o namenloses Sehnen 2" | Woher, o namenloses Sehnen
| data-sort-value="1815-07-25" | 25/7/1815
| data-sort-value="Text by Kosegarten, Ludwig Gotthard, Woher, o namenloses Sehnen 2" | Text by Kosegarten
|-
| 238
| 238
| data-sort-value="XXX,1894" | (1894)
| data-sort-value="2002,102" | XX, 2No. 102
| data-sort-value="408,38" | IV, 8 
| data-sort-value="Mondnacht, Die" | Die Mondnacht
| data-sort-value="text Siehe, wie die Mondesstrahlen" | Siehe, wie die Mondesstrahlen
| data-sort-value="1815-07-25" | 25/7/1815
| data-sort-value="Text by Kosegarten, Ludwig Gotthard, Siehe, wie die Mondesstrahlen" | Text by Kosegarten
|-
| 239
| 239
| data-sort-value="XXX,1893" | (1893)
| data-sort-value="1507,011" | XV, 7No. 11
| data-sort-value="214,00" | II, 14
| Claudine von Villa Bella
| data-sort-value="theatre (Singspiel in 3 acts)" | (Singspiel in three acts)
| data-sort-value="1815-07-26" | started26/7/1815
| data-sort-value="Text by Goethe, Johann Wolfgang von Claudine von Villa Bella" | Text by Goethe; For ssttbbSATB and orchestra; Overture (in AGA) – Nos. 1–8 (Act I, in AGA) – No. 9 (fragment from Act II) – No. 10 (fragment from Act III); Other music lost
|-
| 240
| 240
| data-sort-value="XXX,1894" | (1894)
| data-sort-value="2002,103" | XX, 2No. 103
| data-sort-value="408,39" | IV, 8 
| Huldigung
| data-sort-value="text Ganz verloren, ganz versunken" | Ganz verloren, ganz versunken
| data-sort-value="1815-07-27" | 27/7/1815
| data-sort-value="Text by Kosegarten, Ludwig Gotthard, Ganz verloren, ganz versunken" | Text by Kosegarten
|-
| 241
| 241
| data-sort-value="XXX,1894" | (1894)
| data-sort-value="2002,104" | XX, 2No. 104
| data-sort-value="408,40" | IV, 8 
| Alles um Liebe
| data-sort-value="text Was ist es, das die Seele füllt?" | Was ist es, das die Seele füllt?
| data-sort-value="1815-07-27" | 27/7/1815
| data-sort-value="Text by Kosegarten, Ludwig Gotthard, Was ist es, das die Seele füllt?" | Text by Kosegarten
|-
| 242
| 242
| data-sort-value="XXX,1892" | (1892)
| data-sort-value="1900,018" | XIXNo. 18
| data-sort-value="304,27" | III, 4No. 27
| Trinklied im Winter, a.k.a. Winterlied, D 242
| data-sort-value="text Das Glas gefullt! 1" | Das Glas gefüllt!
| data-sort-value="1815-08-01" | August1815?
| data-sort-value="Text by Holty, Ludwig Heinrich Christoph, Das Glas gefullt! 1" | Text by Hölty; For ttb
|-
| data-sort-value="999.02421" |
| data-sort-value="242.1" | 242A
| data-sort-value="ZZZZ" |
| data-sort-value="ZZZZ" |
| data-sort-value="408,41" | IV, 8No. 41
| Winterabend, D 242A, a.k.a. Winterlied
| data-sort-value="text Das Glas gefullt! 2" | Das Glas gefüllt!
| data-sort-value="1815-01-01" | 1815?
| data-sort-value="Text by Holty, Ludwig Heinrich Christoph, Das Glas gefullt! 2" | Text by Hölty
|-
| 243
| 243
| data-sort-value="XXX,1892" | (1892)
| data-sort-value="1900,019" | XIXNo. 19
| data-sort-value="304,28" | III, 4No. 28
| data-sort-value="Fruhlingslied, D 243" | Frühlingslied, D 243
| data-sort-value="text Die Luft ist blau 1" | Die Luft ist blau
| data-sort-value="1815-08-01" | August1815?
| data-sort-value="Text by Holty, Ludwig Heinrich Christoph, Die Luft ist blau 1" | Text by Hölty; For ttb
|-
| 244
| 244
| data-sort-value="XXX,1892" | (1892)
| data-sort-value="1900,027" | XIXNo. 27
| data-sort-value="304,29" | III, 4 No. 29VIII, 2 No. 25
| data-sort-value="Willkommen, lieber schoner Mai" | Willkommen, lieber schöner Mai
| data-sort-value="text Willkommen, lieber schoner Mai" | Willkommen, lieber schöner Mai
| data-sort-value="1815-08-01" | August1815?
| data-sort-value="Text by Holty, Ludwig Heinrich Christoph, Willkommen, lieber schoner Mai" | Text by Hölty; Canon for three voices in two sections
|-
| 245
| data-sort-value="999.0587" | 587
| data-sort-value="ZZZZ" |

| data-sort-value="ZZZZ" |

| data-sort-value="ZZZZ" |

| data-sort-value="ZZZZ" |

| data-sort-value="ZZZZ" |

| data-sort-value="ZZZZ" |

| See 
|-
| 246
| 246
| data-sort-value="XXX,1830" | (1830)
| data-sort-value="2003,109" | XX, 3No. 109
| data-sort-value="408,42" | IV, 8No. 42
| data-sort-value="Burgschaft, Die, D 246" | Die Bürgschaft, D 246
| data-sort-value="text Zu Dionys, dem Tyrannen" | Zu Dionys, dem Tyrannen
| data-sort-value="1815-08-01" | August1815
| data-sort-value="Text by Schiller, Friedrich, Zu Dionys, dem Tyrannen" | Text by Schiller; Partly reused in 
|-
| 247
| 247
| data-sort-value="118,1829-6" | 118p,6(1829)
| data-sort-value="2003,119" | XX, 3No. 119
| data-sort-value="408,43" | IV, 8No. 43
| data-sort-value="Spinnerin, Die" | Die Spinnerin
| data-sort-value="text Als ich still und ruhig spann" | Als ich still und ruhig spann
| data-sort-value="1815-08-01" | August1815
| data-sort-value="Text by Goethe, Johann Wolfgang von, Als ich still und ruhig spann" | Text by Goethe
|-
| 248
| 248
| data-sort-value="118,1829-4" | 118p,4(1829)
| data-sort-value="2003,135" | XX, 3No. 135
| data-sort-value="408,44" | IV, 8No. 44
| Lob des Tokayers
| data-sort-value="text O kostlicher Tokayer, o koniglicher Wein" | O köstlicher Tokayer, o königlicher Wein
| data-sort-value="1815-08-01" | August1815
| data-sort-value="Text by Baumberg, Gabriele von, O kostlicher Tokayer, o koniglicher Wein" | Text by Baumberg
|-
| 249
| 249
| data-sort-value="ZZZZ" |
| data-sort-value="ZZZZ" |
| data-sort-value="302,93" | III, 2bAnh. No. 4a
| data-sort-value="Schlacht, Die, D 249" | Die Schlacht, D 249
| data-sort-value="text Schwer und dumpfig 1" | Schwer und dumpfig
| data-sort-value="1815-08-01" | 1/8/1815
| data-sort-value="Text by Schiller, Friedrich, Schwer und dumpfig 1" | Text by Schiller; Sketch
|-
| 250
| 250
| data-sort-value="XXX,1872" | (1872)
| data-sort-value="2003,105" | XX, 3No. 105
| data-sort-value="413,00" | IV, 13
| data-sort-value="Geheimnis, Das, D 250" | Das Geheimnis, D 250
| data-sort-value="text Sie konnte mir kein Wortchen sagen 1" | Sie konnte mir kein Wörtchen sagen
| data-sort-value="1815-08-07" | 7/8/1815
| data-sort-value="Text by Schiller, Friedrich, Sie konnte mir kein Wortchen sagen 1" | Text by Schiller
|-
| 251
| 251
| data-sort-value="XXX,1872" | (1872)
| data-sort-value="2003,106" | XX, 3No. 106
| data-sort-value="404,00" | IV, 4
| Hoffnung, D 251
| data-sort-value="text Es reden und traumen die Menschen viel 1" | Es reden und träumen die Menschen viel
| data-sort-value="1815-08-07" | 7/8/1815
| data-sort-value="Text by Schiller, Friedrich, Es reden und traumen die Menschen viel 1" | Text by Schiller
|-
| 252
| 252
| data-sort-value="XXX,1887" | (1887)
| data-sort-value="2003,108" | XX, 3No. 108
| data-sort-value="408,46" | IV, 8No. 46
| data-sort-value="Madchen aus der Fremde, Das, D 252" | Das Mädchen aus der Fremde, D 252
| data-sort-value="text In einem Tal bei armen Hirten 2" | In einem Tal bei armen Hirten
| data-sort-value="1815-08-12" | 12/8/1815
| data-sort-value="Text by Schiller, Friedrich, In einem Tal bei armen Hirten 2" | Text by Schiller
|-
| 253
| 253
| data-sort-value="XXX,1887" | (1887)
| data-sort-value="2003,110" | XX, 3No. 110
| data-sort-value="304,30" | III, 4 No. 30IV, 8 No. 47
| Punschlied: Im Norden zu singen
| data-sort-value="text Auf der Berge freien Hohen" | Auf der Berge freien Höhen
| data-sort-value="1815-08-18" | 18/8/1815
| data-sort-value="Text by Schiller, Friedrich, Auf der Berge freien Hohen" | Text by Schiller; Two versions: 2nd for two voices
|-
| 254
| 254
| data-sort-value="XXX,1887" | (1887)
| data-sort-value="2003,111" | XX, 3No. 111
| data-sort-value="408,48" | IV, 8No. 48
| data-sort-value="Gott und die Bajadere, Der" | Der Gott und die Bajadere
| data-sort-value="text Mahadoh, der Herr der Erde" | Mahadöh, der Herr der Erde
| data-sort-value="1815-08-18" | 18/8/1815
| data-sort-value="Text by Goethe, Johann Wolfgang von, Mahadoh, der Herr der Erde" | Text by Goethe
|-
| 255
| 255
| data-sort-value="XXX,1850" | (1850)
| data-sort-value="2003,112" | XX, 3No. 112
| data-sort-value="408,49" | IV, 8No. 49
| data-sort-value="Rattenfanger, Der" | Der Rattenfänger
| data-sort-value="text Ich bin der wohlbekannte Sanger" | Ich bin der wohlbekannte Sänger
| data-sort-value="1815-08-19" | 19/8/1815
| data-sort-value="Text by Goethe, Johann Wolfgang von, Ich bin der wohlbekannte Sanger" | Text by Goethe
|-
| 256
| 256
| data-sort-value="XXX,1887" | (1887)
| data-sort-value="2003,113" | XX, 3No. 113
| data-sort-value="408,50" | IV, 8No. 50
| data-sort-value="Schatzgraber, Der" | Der Schatzgräber
| data-sort-value="text Arm am Beutel, krank am Herzen" | Arm am Beutel, krank am Herzen
| data-sort-value="1815-08-19" | 19/8/1815
| data-sort-value="Text by Goethe, Johann Wolfgang von, Arm am Beutel, krank am Herzen" | Text by Goethe
|-
| 257
| 257
| data-sort-value="003,1821-3" | 3,3(1821)
| data-sort-value="2003,114" | XX, 3No. 114
| data-sort-value="401,0033" | IV, 1a
| data-sort-value="Heidenroslein" | Heidenröslein
| data-sort-value="text Sah ein Knab' ein Roslein stehn" | Sah ein Knab' ein Röslein stehn
| data-sort-value="1815-08-19" | 19/8/1815
| data-sort-value="Text by Goethe, Johann Wolfgang von, Sah ein Knab' ein Roslein stehn" | Text by Goethe
|-
| 258
| 258
| data-sort-value="XXX,1887" | (1887)
| data-sort-value="2003,115" | XX, 3No. 115
| data-sort-value="408,51" | IV, 8No. 51
| Bundeslied
| data-sort-value="text In allen guten Stunden" | In allen guten Stunden
| data-sort-value="1815-08-19" | 19/8/1815
| data-sort-value="Text by Goethe, Johann Wolfgang von, In allen guten Stunden" | Text by Goethe
|-
| 259
| 259
| data-sort-value="XXX,1850" | (1850)
| data-sort-value="2003,116" | XX, 3No. 116
| data-sort-value="409,27" | IV, 9 No. 27
| An den Mond, D 259
| data-sort-value="text Fullest wieder Busch und Tal 1" | Füllest wieder Busch und Tal
| data-sort-value="1815-08-19" | 19/8/1815
| data-sort-value="Text by Goethe, Johann Wolfgang von, Fullest wieder Busch und Tal 1" | Text by Goethe
|-
| 260
| 260
| data-sort-value="115,1829-2" | 115p,2(1829)
| data-sort-value="2003,117" | XX, 3No. 117
| data-sort-value="408,52" | IV, 8No. 52
| Wonne der Wehmut
| data-sort-value="text Trocknet nicht, trocknet nicht" | Trocknet nicht, trocknet nicht
| data-sort-value="1815-08-20" | 20/8/1815
| data-sort-value="Text by Goethe, Johann Wolfgang von, Trocknet nicht, trocknet nicht" | Text by Goethe; Reused in 
|-
| 261
| 261
| data-sort-value="XXX,1850" | (1850)
| data-sort-value="2003,118" | XX, 3No. 118
| data-sort-value="408,53" | IV, 8No. 53
| data-sort-value="Wer kauft Liebesgotter" | Wer kauft Liebesgötter?
| data-sort-value="text Von allen schonen Waren" | Von allen schönen Waren
| data-sort-value="1815-08-21" | 21/8/1815
| data-sort-value="Text by Goethe, Johann Wolfgang von from Zauberflote, Der, II, Von allen schonen Waren" | Text by Goethe, from Der Zauberflöte zweiter Teil
|-
| 262
| 262
| data-sort-value="XXX,1895" | (1895)
| data-sort-value="2003,134" | XX, 3No. 134
| data-sort-value="409,01" | IV, 9 No. 1
| data-sort-value="Frohlichkeit, Die" | Die Fröhlichkeit
| data-sort-value="text Wess' Adern leichtes Blut durchspringt" | Wess' Adern leichtes Blut durchspringt
| data-sort-value="1815-08-22" | 22/8/1815
| data-sort-value="Text by Prandstatter, Martin Joseph, Wess' Adern leichtes Blut durchspringt"| Text by 
|-
| 263
| 263
| data-sort-value="XXX,1848" | (1848)
| data-sort-value="2003,123" | XX, 3No. 123
| data-sort-value="409,02" | IV, 9 No. 2
| Cora an die Sonne
| data-sort-value="text Nach so vielen truben Tagen" | Nach so vielen trüben Tagen
| data-sort-value="1815-08-22" | 22/8/1815
| data-sort-value="Text by Baumberg, Gabriele von, Nach so vielen truben Tagen" | Text by Baumberg
|-
| 264
| 264
| data-sort-value="XXX,1850" | (1850)(1872)
| data-sort-value="2003,124" | XX, 3No. 124
| data-sort-value="409,03" | IV, 9 No. 3
| data-sort-value="Morgenkuss, Der" | Der Morgenkuß
| data-sort-value="text Durch eine ganze Nacht sich nah zu sein" | Durch eine ganze Nacht sich nah zu sein
| data-sort-value="1815-08-22" | 22/8/1815
| data-sort-value="Text by Baumberg, Gabriele von, Durch eine ganze Nacht sich nah zu sein" | Text by Baumberg; Two versions: 2nd, publ. in 1850, in AGA
|- id="D 265"
| 265
| 265
| data-sort-value="XXX,1895" | (1895)
| data-sort-value="2003,125" | XX, 3No. 125
| data-sort-value="409,04" | IV, 9 No. 4
| data-sort-value="Abendstandchen: An Lina" | Abendständchen: An Lina
| data-sort-value="text Sei sanft wie ihre Seele" | Sei sanft wie ihre Seele
| data-sort-value="1815-08-23" | 23/8/1815
| data-sort-value="Text by Baumberg, Gabriele von, Sei sanft wie ihre Seele" | Text by Baumberg
|-
| 266
| 266
| data-sort-value="XXX,1895" | (1895)
| data-sort-value="2003,126" | XX, 3No. 126
| data-sort-value="409,05" | IV, 9 No. 5
| Morgenlied, D 266
| data-sort-value="text Willkommen, rotes Morgenlicht!" | Willkommen, rotes Morgenlicht!
| data-sort-value="1815-08-24" | 24/8/1815
| data-sort-value="Text by Stolberg-Stolberg, Friedrich Leopold zu, Willkommen, rotes Morgenlicht!" | Text by Stolberg-Stolberg
|-
| 267
| 267
| data-sort-value="XXX,1872" | (1872)
| data-sort-value="1600,017" | XVINo. 17
| data-sort-value="303,19" | III, 3 No. 19
| data-sort-value="Trinklied, D 267" | Trinklied, D 267
| data-sort-value="text Auf! Jeder sei nun froh und sorgenfrei!" | Auf! Jeder sei nun froh und sorgenfrei!
| data-sort-value="1815-08-25" | 25/8/1815
| For ttbb and piano
|-
| 268
| 268
| data-sort-value="XXX,1872" | (1872)
| data-sort-value="1600,018" | XVINo. 18
| data-sort-value="303,20" | III, 3 No. 20
| Bergknappenlied
| data-sort-value="text Hinab, ihr Bruder, in den Schacht!" | Hinab, ihr Brüder, in den Schacht!
| data-sort-value="1815-08-25" | 25/8/1815
| For ttbb and piano
|-
| 269
| 269
| data-sort-value="XXX,1848" | (1848)
| data-sort-value="1800,005" | XVIIINo. 5
| data-sort-value="303,05" | III, 3 No. 5Anh. IV No. 2
| data-sort-value="Leben, Das" | Das Leben
| data-sort-value="text Das Leben ist ein Traum" | Das Leben ist ein Traum
| data-sort-value="1815-08-25" | 25/8/1815
|-
| 270
| 270
| data-sort-value="118,1829-5" | 118p,5(1829)
| data-sort-value="2003,127" | XX, 3No. 127
| data-sort-value="409,06" | IV, 9 No. 6
| An die Sonne, D 270
| data-sort-value="text Sinke, liebe Sonne" | Sinke, liebe Sonne
| data-sort-value="1815-08-25" | 25/8/1815
| data-sort-value="Text by Baumberg, Gabriele von, Sinke, liebe Sonne" | Text by Baumberg
|-
| 271
| 271
| data-sort-value="XXX,1895" | (1895)
| data-sort-value="2003,128" | XX, 3No. 128
| data-sort-value="409,07" | IV, 9 No. 7
| data-sort-value="Weiberfreund, Der" | Der Weiberfreund
| data-sort-value="text Noch fand von Evens Tochterscharen ich keine" | Noch fand von Evens Töchterscharen ich keine
| data-sort-value="1815-08-25" | 25/8/1815
|-
| 272
| 272
| data-sort-value="XXX,1872" | (1872)
| data-sort-value="2003,129" | XX, 3No. 129
| data-sort-value="409,08" | IV, 9 No. 8
| An die Sonne, D 272
| data-sort-value="text Konigliche Morgensonne" | Königliche Morgensonne
| data-sort-value="1815-08-25" | 25/8/1815
| data-sort-value="Text by Tiedge, Christoph August, Königliche Morgensonne" | Text by Tiedge
|-
| 273
| 273
| data-sort-value="XXX,1895" | (1895)
| data-sort-value="2003,130" | XX, 3No. 130
| data-sort-value="409,09" | IV, 9 No. 9
| data-sort-value="Lilla an die Morgenrote" | Lilla an die Morgenröte
| data-sort-value="text Wie schon bist du, du guldne Morgenrote" | Wie schön bist du, du güldne Morgenröte
| data-sort-value="1815-08-25" | 25/8/1815
| data-sort-value="ZZZZ" |
|-
| 274
| 274
| data-sort-value="XXX,1850" | (1850)
| data-sort-value="2003,131" | XX, 3No. 131
| data-sort-value="409,10" | IV, 9 No. 10
| Tischlerlied
| data-sort-value="text Mein Handwerk geht durch alle Welt" | Mein Handwerk geht durch alle Welt
| data-sort-value="1815-08-25" | 25/8/1815
| data-sort-value="ZZZZ" |
|-
| 275
| 275
| data-sort-value="XXX,1895" | (1895)
| data-sort-value="2003,132" | XX, 3No. 132
| data-sort-value="409,11" | IV, 9 No. 11
| data-sort-value="Totenkranz fur ein Kind" | Totenkranz für ein Kind
| data-sort-value="text Sanft wehn, im Hauch der Abendluft" | Sanft wehn, im Hauch der Abendluft
| data-sort-value="1815-08-25" | 25/8/1815
| data-sort-value="Text by Matthisson, Friedrich von, Sanft wehn, im Hauch der Abendluft" | Text by Matthisson
|-
| 276
| 276
| data-sort-value="XXX,1895" | (1895)
| data-sort-value="2003,133" | XX, 3No. 133
| data-sort-value="409,12" | IV, 9 No. 12
| Abendlied, D 276
| data-sort-value="text Gross und rotenflammet" | Groß und rotenflammet
| data-sort-value="1815-08-28" | 28/8/1815
| data-sort-value="Text by Stolberg-Stolberg, Friedrich Leopold zu, Gross und rotenflammet" | Text by Stolberg-Stolberg
|-
| 277
| 277
| data-sort-value="XXX,1892" | (1892)
| data-sort-value="1900,007" | XIXNo. 7
| data-sort-value="303,06" | III, 3 No. 6
| Punschlied, D 277
| data-sort-value="text Vier Elemente, inning gesellt" | Vier Elemente, inning gesellt
| data-sort-value="1815-08-29" | 29/8/1815
| data-sort-value="Text by Schiller, Friedrich, Vier Elemente, inning gesellt" | Text by Schiller; For ttb and piano
|-
| data-sort-value="999.02771" |
| data-sort-value="277.1" | 277A
| data-sort-value="XXX,1925" | (1925)
| data-sort-value="ZZZZ" |
| data-sort-value="724,00" | VII/2, 4
| Minuet with Trio, D 277A
| data-sort-value="key A minor F major" | A minor (minuet) / F major (trio)
| data-sort-value="1815-09-01" | September1815?
| For piano; Partly reused in 
|-
| 278
| 278
| data-sort-value="XXX,1830" | (1830)(1897)
| data-sort-value="2003,147" | XX, 3No. 147;XXII, 11No. 147
| data-sort-value="409,13" | IV, 9 No. 13 Anh. No. 1
| Ossians Lied nach dem Falle Nathos
| data-sort-value="text Beugt euch aus euren Wolken nieder" | Beugt euch aus euren Wolken nieder
| data-sort-value="1815-01-01" | 1815
| data-sort-value="Text by Macpherson, James (Ossian) from Dar-Thula, Beugt euch aus euren Wolken nieder" | Text by Macpherson (Ossian), from Dar-Thula, transl. by E. Baron de Harold; Two versions: 1st is a fragment – 2nd publ. in 1830
|-
| 279
| 279
| data-sort-value="XXX,1888" | (1888)
| data-sort-value="1000,002" | X No. 2
| data-sort-value="721,02" | VII/2, 1No. 2
| Piano Sonata, D 279
| data-sort-value="key C major" | C major
| data-sort-value="1815-09-01" | September1815
|-
| 280
| 280
| data-sort-value="XXX,1837" | (1837)
| data-sort-value="2003,139" | XX, 3No. 139
| data-sort-value="409,14" | IV, 9 No. 14
| data-sort-value="Rosenband, Das" | Das Rosenband
| data-sort-value="text Im Fruhlingsgarten fand ich sie" | Im Frühlingsgarten fand ich sie
| data-sort-value="1815-09-01" | September1815
| data-sort-value="Text by Klopstock, Friedrich Gottlieb, Im Fruhlingsgarten fand ich sie" | Text by Klopstock
|-
| 281
| 281
| data-sort-value="XXX,1830" | (1830)
| data-sort-value="2003,148" | XX, 3No. 148
| data-sort-value="409,15" | IV, 9 No. 15
| data-sort-value="Madchen von Inistore, Das" | Das Mädchen von Inistore
| data-sort-value="text Madchen Inistores, wein auf dem Felsen" | Mädchen Inistores, wein auf dem Felsen
| data-sort-value="1815-09-01" | September1815
| data-sort-value="Text by Macpherson, James (Ossian) from Fingal, Book I, Rolle, Madchen Inistores, wein auf dem Felsen" | Text by Macpherson (Ossian), from Fingal, Book I, transl. by E. Baron de Harold
|-
| 282
| 282
| data-sort-value="XXX,1830" | (1830)
| data-sort-value="2004,188" | XX, 4No. 188
| data-sort-value="409,16" | IV, 9 No. 16
| Cronnan
| data-sort-value="text Ich sitz' bei der moosigten Quelle" | Ich sitz' bei der moosigten Quelle
| data-sort-value="1815-09-05" | 5/9/1815
| data-sort-value="Text by Macpherson, James (Ossian) from Carric-thura, Ich sitz' bei der moosigten Quelle" | Text by Macpherson (Ossian), from Carric-thura, transl. by E. Baron de Harold
|-
| 283
| 283
| data-sort-value="172,1865-5" | 172p,5(1865)
| data-sort-value="2003,136" | XX, 3No. 136
| data-sort-value="411,00" | IV, 11
| data-sort-value="An den Fruhling, D 283" | An den Frühling, D 283
| data-sort-value="text Willkommen, schoner Jungling! 1" | Willkommen, schöner Jüngling!
| data-sort-value="1815-09-06" | 6/9/1815
| data-sort-value="Text by Schiller, Friedrich, Willkommen, schoner Jungling! 1" | Text by Schiller (other settings:  and 587)
|-
| 284
| 284
| data-sort-value="XXX,1895" | (1895)
| data-sort-value="2003,137" | XX, 3No. 137
| data-sort-value="409,17" | IV, 9 No. 17
| Lied, D 284
| data-sort-value="text Es ist so angenehm, so suss" | Es ist so angenehm, so süß
| data-sort-value="1815-09-06" | 6/9/1815
| data-sort-value="Text by Schiller, Friedrich, Es ist so angenehm, so suss" | Text by Schiller(?)
|-
| 285
| 285
| data-sort-value="XXX,1885" | (1885)(1895)
| data-sort-value="2003,138" | XX, 3No. 138
| data-sort-value="409,18" | IV, 9 No. 18 Anh. No. 2
| Furcht der Geliebten, a.k.a. An Cidli
| data-sort-value="text Cidli, du weinest" | Cidli, du weinest
| data-sort-value="1815-09-12" | 12/9/1815
| data-sort-value="Text by Klopstock, Friedrich Gottlieb from Oden, Cidli, du weinest" | Text by Klopstock, from Oden; Two versions: 2nd publ. in 1885
|-
| 286
| 286
| data-sort-value="XXX,1837" | (1837)(1895)
| data-sort-value="2003,140" | XX, 3No. 140
| data-sort-value="409,19" | IV, 9 No. 19
| Selma und Selmar
| data-sort-value="text Weine du nicht" | Weine du nicht
| data-sort-value="1815-09-14" | 14/9/1815
| data-sort-value="Text by Klopstock, Friedrich Gottlieb, Weine du nicht" | Text by Klopstock; Two versions: 2nd publ. in 1837
|-
| 287
| 287
| data-sort-value="XXX,1895" | (1895)
| data-sort-value="2003,141" | XX, 3No. 141
| data-sort-value="409,20" | IV, 9 No. 20
| Vaterlandslied
| data-sort-value="text Ich bin ein deutsches Madchen" | Ich bin ein deutsches Mädchen
| data-sort-value="1815-09-14" | 14/9/1815
| data-sort-value="Text by Klopstock, Friedrich Gottlieb from Oden, Ich bin ein deutsches Mädchen" | Text by Klopstock, from Oden; Two versions
|-
| 288
| 288
| data-sort-value="XXX,1895" | (1895)
| data-sort-value="2003,142" | XX, 3No. 142
| data-sort-value="409,21" | IV, 9 No. 21
| An Sie
| data-sort-value="text Zeit, Verkundigerin der besten Freuden" | Zeit, Verkündigerin der besten Freuden
| data-sort-value="1815-09-14" | 14/9/1815
| data-sort-value="Text by Klopstock, Friedrich Gottlieb from Oden, Zeit, Verkundigerin der besten Freuden" | Text by Klopstock, from Oden
|-
| 289
| 289
| data-sort-value="XXX,1895" | (1895)
| data-sort-value="2003,143" | XX, 3No. 143
| data-sort-value="409,22" | IV, 9 No. 22
| data-sort-value="Sommernacht, Die" | Die Sommernacht
| data-sort-value="text Wenn der Schimmer von dem Monde" | Wenn der Schimmer von dem Monde
| data-sort-value="1815-09-14" | 14/9/1815
| data-sort-value="Text by Klopstock, Friedrich Gottlieb, Wenn der Schimmer von dem Monde" | Text by Klopstock; Two versions
|-
| 290
| 290
| data-sort-value="XXX,1837" | (1837)
| data-sort-value="2003,144" | XX, 3No. 144
| data-sort-value="409,23" | IV, 9 No. 23
| data-sort-value="Fruhen Graber, Die" | Die frühen Gräber
| data-sort-value="text Willkommen, o silberner Mond" | Willkommen, o silberner Mond
| data-sort-value="1815-09-14" | 14/9/1815
| data-sort-value="Text by Klopstock, Friedrich Gottlieb from Oden, Willkommen, o silberner Mond" | Text by Klopstock, from Oden
|-
| 291
| 291
| data-sort-value="XXX,1831" | (1831)(1895)
| data-sort-value="2003,145" | XX, 3No. 145
| data-sort-value="409,24" | IV, 9 No. 24
| data-sort-value="Unendlichen, Dem" | Dem Unendlichen
| data-sort-value="text Wie erhebt sich das Herz" | Wie erhebt sich das Herz
| data-sort-value="1815-09-15" | 15/9/1815
| data-sort-value="Text by Klopstock, Friedrich Gottlieb, Wie erhebt sich das Herz" | Text by Klopstock; Three versions: 2nd publ. in 1831
|-
| 292
| data-sort-value="999.0371" | 371
| data-sort-value="ZZZZ" |

| data-sort-value="ZZZZ" |

| data-sort-value="ZZZZ" |

| data-sort-value="ZZZZ" |

| data-sort-value="ZZZZ" |

| data-sort-value="ZZZZ" |

| See 
|-
| 293
| 293
| data-sort-value="XXX,1830" | (1830)
| data-sort-value="2003,146" | XX, 3No. 146
| data-sort-value="409,25" | IV, 9 No. 25
| Shilric und Vinvela
| data-sort-value="text Mein Geliebter ist ein Sohn des Hugels" | Mein Geliebter ist ein Sohn des Hügels
| data-sort-value="1815-09-20" | 20/9/1815
| data-sort-value="Text by Macpherson, James (Ossian) from Carric-thura, Mein Geliebter ist ein Sohn des Hugels" | Text by Macpherson (Ossian), from Carric-thura, transl. by E. Baron de Harold
|-
| 294
| 294
| data-sort-value="XXX,1892" | (1892)
| data-sort-value="1700,004" | XVIINo. 4
| data-sort-value="301,00" | III, 1
| Namensfeier für Franz Michael Vierthaler, a.k.a. Gratulations-Kantate
| data-sort-value="text Erhabner! Verehrter Freund der Jugend!" | Erhabner! Verehrter Freund der Jugend!
| data-sort-value="1815-09-27" | 27/9/1815
| For stbSTB and orchestra
|-
| 295
| 295
| data-sort-value="XXX,1872" | (1872)(1895)
| data-sort-value="2003,175" | XX, 3No. 175
| data-sort-value="409,26" | IV, 9 No. 26
| Hoffnung, D 295
| data-sort-value="text Schaff, das Tagwerk meiner Hande" | Schaff, das Tagwerk meiner Hände
| data-sort-value="1815-01-01" | 1815 or1816?
| data-sort-value="Text by Goethe, Johann Wolfgang von, Schaff, das Tagwerk meiner Hande" | Text by Goethe; Two versions: 1st publ. in 1872
|-
| 296
| 296
| data-sort-value="XXX,1868" | (1868)
| data-sort-value="2003,176" | XX, 3No. 176
| data-sort-value="409,28" | IV, 9 No. 28
| An den Mond, D 296
| data-sort-value="text Fullest wieder Busch und Tal 2" | Füllest wieder Busch und Tal
| data-sort-value="1815-01-01" | 1815 or1816?
| data-sort-value="Text by Goethe, Johann Wolfgang von, Fullest wieder Busch und Tal 2" | Text by Goethe
|-
| 297
| 297
| data-sort-value="XXX,1850" | (1850)(1895)
| data-sort-value="2003,171" | XX, 3No. 171
| data-sort-value="409,29" | IV, 9 No. 29 Anh. No. 3
| Augenlied
| data-sort-value="text Susse Augen, klare Bronnen!" | Süße Augen, klare Bronnen!
| data-sort-value="1817-03-21" | spring1817?
| data-sort-value="Text by Mayrhofer, Johann, Susse Augen, klare Bronnen!" | Text by Mayrhofer; Two versions: 2nd publ. in 1850
|-
| 298
| 298
| data-sort-value="XXX,1895" | (1895)
| data-sort-value="2003,170" | XX, 3No. 170
| data-sort-value="409,30" | IV, 9 No. 30
| Liane
| data-sort-value="text Hast du Lianen nicht gesehen?" | Hast du Lianen nicht gesehen?
| data-sort-value="1815-10-01" | October1815
| data-sort-value="Text by Mayrhofer, Johann, Hast du Lianen nicht gesehen?" | Text by Mayrhofer
|-
| 299
| 299
| data-sort-value="XXX,1897" | (1897)(1912)
| data-sort-value="2103,029" | XXI, 3No. 29
| data-sort-value="726,00" | VII/2, 6
| data-sort-value="Ecossaises, 12, D 299" | Twelve Écossaises, D 299
| data-sort-value="key I" | Various keys
| data-sort-value="1815-10-03" | 3/10/1815
| For piano; No. 1 similar to  Écoss. No. 1; Nos. 9–12 publ. in 1912
|-
| 300
| 300
| data-sort-value="XXX,1842" | (1842)
| data-sort-value="2006,398" | XX, 6No. 398
| data-sort-value="409,31" | IV, 9 No. 31
| data-sort-value="Jungling an der Quelle, Der" | Der Jüngling an der Quelle
| data-sort-value="text Leise, rieselnder Quell" | Leise, rieselnder Quell
| data-sort-value="1816-01-01" | 1816 or1817?
| data-sort-value="Text by Salis-Seewis, Johann Gaudenz von, Leise, rieselnder Quell" | Text by Salis-Seewis
|-
| 301
| 301
| data-sort-value="XXX,1842" | (1842)
| data-sort-value="2003,149" | XX, 3No. 149
| data-sort-value="409,32" | IV, 9 No. 32
| Lambertine
| data-sort-value="text O Liebe, die mein Herz erfullet" | O Liebe, die mein Herz erfüllet
| data-sort-value="1815-10-12" | 12/10/1815
| data-sort-value="Text by Stoll, Josef Ludwig, O Liebe, die mein Herz erfullet" | Text by 
|-
| 302
| 302
| data-sort-value="XXX,1895" | (1895)
| data-sort-value="2003,150" | XX, 3No. 150
| data-sort-value="409,33" | IV, 9 No. 33
| Labetrank der Liebe
| data-sort-value="text Wenn im Spiele leiser Tone" | Wenn im Spiele leiser Töne
| data-sort-value="1815-10-15" | 15/10/1815
| data-sort-value="Text by Stoll, Josef Ludwig, Wenn im Spiele leiser Tone" | Text by 
|-
| 303
| 303
| data-sort-value="XXX,1887" | (1887)
| data-sort-value="2003,151" | XX, 3No. 151
| data-sort-value="409,34" | IV, 9 No. 34
| An die Geliebte
| data-sort-value="text O, dass ich dir vom stillen Auge" | O, daß ich dir vom stillen Auge
| data-sort-value="1815-10-15" | 15/10/1815
|-
| 304
| 304
| data-sort-value="XXX,1895" | (1895)
| data-sort-value="2003,152" | XX, 3No. 152
| data-sort-value="409,35" | IV, 9 No. 35
| Wiegenlied, D 304
| data-sort-value="text Schlumm're sanft! Noch an dem Mutterherzen" | Schlumm're sanft! Noch an dem Mutterherzen
| data-sort-value="1815-10-15" | 15/10/1815
| data-sort-value="Text by Korner, Theodor, Schlumm're sanft! Noch an dem Mutterherzen" | Text by Körner
|-
| 305
| 305
| data-sort-value="XXX,1895" | (1895)
| data-sort-value="2003,153" | XX, 3No. 153
| data-sort-value="409,36" | IV, 9 No. 36
| data-sort-value="Mein Gruss an den Mai" | Mein Gruß an den Mai
| data-sort-value="text Sei mir gegrusst, o Mai" | Sei mir gegrüßt, o Mai
| data-sort-value="1815-10-15" | 15/10/1815
| data-sort-value="Text by Kumpf, Johann Gottfried, Sei mir gegrusst, o Mai" | Text by 
|-
| 306
| 306
| data-sort-value="XXX,1895" | (1895)
| data-sort-value="2003,154" | XX, 3No. 154
| data-sort-value="409,37" | IV, 9 No. 37
| Skolie, D 306
| data-sort-value="text Lasst im Morgenstrahl des Mai'n" | Laßt im Morgenstrahl des Mai'n
| data-sort-value="1815-10-15" | 15/10/1815
| data-sort-value="Text by Deinhardstein, Johann Ludwig, Lasst im Morgenstrahl des Mai'n" | Text by 
|-
| 307
| 307
| data-sort-value="XXX,1895" | (1895)
| data-sort-value="2003,155" | XX, 3No. 155
| data-sort-value="409,38" | IV, 9 No. 38
| data-sort-value="Sternenwelten, Die" | Die Sternenwelten
| data-sort-value="text Oben drehen sich die grossen unbekannten Welten dort" | Oben drehen sich die großen unbekannten Welten dort
| data-sort-value="1815-10-15" | 15/10/1815
|-
| 308
| 308
| data-sort-value="XXX,1895" | (1895)
| data-sort-value="2003,156" | XX, 3No. 156
| data-sort-value="409,39" | IV, 9 No. 39
| data-sort-value="Macht der Liebe, Die" | Die Macht der Liebe
| data-sort-value="text Uberall, wohin mein Auge blicket" | Überall, wohin mein Auge blicket
| data-sort-value="1815-10-15" | 15/10/1815
| data-sort-value="Text by Kalchberg, Johann von, Uberall, wohin mein Auge blicket" | Text by 
|-
| 309
| 309
| data-sort-value="XXX,1872" | (1872)
| data-sort-value="2003,157" | XX, 3No. 157
| data-sort-value="409,40" | IV, 9 No. 40
| data-sort-value="Gestorte Gluck, Das" | Das gestörte Glück
| data-sort-value="text Ich hab' ein heisses junges Blut" | Ich hab' ein heißes junges Blut
| data-sort-value="1815-10-15" | 15/10/1815
| data-sort-value="Text by Korner, Theodor, Ich hab' ein heisses junges Blut" | Text by Körner
|-
| data-sort-value="999.03091" |
| data-sort-value="309.1" | 309A
| data-sort-value="ZZZZ" |
| data-sort-value="ZZZZ" |
| data-sort-value="721,92" | VII/2, 1Anh. No. 2
| Rondo, D 309A
| data-sort-value="key C major" | C major
| data-sort-value="1815-01-01" | 1815
| For piano; Fragment; 4th movement of ?
|-
| 310
| 310
| data-sort-value="XXX,1895" | (1895)
| data-sort-value="2003,158" | XX, 3No. 158
| data-sort-value="403,00" | IV, 3
| data-sort-value="Sehnsucht, D 310" | Sehnsucht, D 310, a.k.a. Lied der Mignon
| data-sort-value="text Nur wer die Sehnsucht kennt 1" | Nur wer die Sehnsucht kennt
| data-sort-value="1815-10-18" | 18/10/1815
| data-sort-value="Text by Goethe, Johann Wolfgang von from Wilhelm Meister's Apprenticeship, Nur wer die Sehnsucht kennt 1" | Text by Goethe, from Wilhelm Meister's Apprenticeship (other settings: , 481, 656 and 877 Nos. 1 & 4); Two versions
|-
| 311
| 311
| data-sort-value="ZZZZ" |
| data-sort-value="ZZZZ" |
| data-sort-value="409,93" | IV, 9Anh. No. 3
| An den Mond, D 311
| data-sort-value="ZZZZ" |
| data-sort-value="1815-10-19" | 19/10/1815?
| For voice and piano; Sketch without text
|-
| 312
| 312
| data-sort-value="058,1826-1" | 58,1(1826)(1895)
| data-sort-value="2003,159" | XX, 3No. 159
| data-sort-value="403,00" | IV, 3
| Hektors Abschied
| data-sort-value="text Will sich Hektor ewig von mir wenden" | Will sich Hektor ewig von mir wenden
| data-sort-value="1815-10-19" | 19/10/1815
| data-sort-value="Text by Schiller, Friedrich, Will sich Hektor ewig von mir wenden" | Text by Schiller; Two versions: 2nd is Op. 58 No. 1
|-
| 313
| 313
| data-sort-value="XXX,1895" | (1895)
| data-sort-value="2003,160" | XX, 3No. 160
| data-sort-value="409,41" | IV, 9 No. 41
| data-sort-value="Sterne, Die, D 313" | Die Sterne, D 313
| data-sort-value="text Wie wohl ist mir im Dunkeln!" | Wie wohl ist mir im Dunkeln!
| data-sort-value="1815-10-19" | 19/10/1815
| data-sort-value="Text by Kosegarten, Ludwig Gotthard, Wie wohl ist mir im Dunkeln!" | Text by Kosegarten
|-
| 314
| 314
| data-sort-value="XXX,1887" | (1887)
| data-sort-value="2003,161" | XX, 3No. 161
| data-sort-value="409,42" | IV, 9 No. 42
| Nachtgesang, D 314
| data-sort-value="text Tiefe Feier schauert um die Welt" | Tiefe Feier schauert um die Welt
| data-sort-value="1815-10-19" | 19/10/1815
| data-sort-value="Text by Kosegarten, Ludwig Gotthard, Tiefe Feier schauert um die Welt" | Text by Kosegarten
|-
| 315
| 315
| data-sort-value="XXX,1895" | (1895)
| data-sort-value="2003,162" | XX, 3No. 162
| data-sort-value="409,43" | IV, 9 No. 43
| An Rosa I
| data-sort-value="text Warum bist du nicht hier" | Warum bist du nicht hier
| data-sort-value="1815-10-19" | 19/10/1815
| data-sort-value="Text by Kosegarten, Ludwig Gotthard, Warum bist du nicht hier" | Text by Kosegarten
|-
| 316
| 316
| data-sort-value="XXX,1895" | (1895)
| data-sort-value="2003,163" | XX, 3No. 163
| data-sort-value="409,44" | IV, 9 No. 44
| An Rosa II
| data-sort-value="text Rosa, denkst du an mich?" | Rosa, denkst du an mich?
| data-sort-value="1815-10-19" | 19/10/1815
| data-sort-value="Text by Kosegarten, Ludwig Gotthard, Rosa, denkst du an mich?" | Text by Kosegarten; Two versions
|-
| 317
| 317
| data-sort-value="XXX,1895" | (1895)
| data-sort-value="2003,164" | XX, 3No. 164
| data-sort-value="409,45" | IV, 9 No. 45
| Idens Schwanenlied
| data-sort-value="text Wie schaust du aus dem Nebelflor" | Wie schaust du aus dem Nebelflor
| data-sort-value="1815-10-19" | 19/10/1815
| data-sort-value="Text by Kosegarten, Ludwig Gotthard, Wie schaust du aus dem Nebelflor" | Text by Kosegarten; Two versions: 2nd in AGA
|- id="D 318"
| 318
| 318
| data-sort-value="XXX,1895" | (1895)
| data-sort-value="2003,165" | XX, 3No. 165
| data-sort-value="409,46" | IV, 9 No. 46
| Schwangesang
| data-sort-value="text Endlich stehn die Pforten offen" | Endlich stehn die Pforten offen
| data-sort-value="1815-10-19" | 19/10/1815
| data-sort-value="Text by Kosegarten, Ludwig Gotthard, Endlich stehn die Pforten offen" | Text by Kosegarten
|-
| 319
| 319
| data-sort-value="XXX,1895" | (1895)
| data-sort-value="2003,166" | XX, 3No. 166
| data-sort-value="409,47" | IV, 9 No. 47
| Luisens Antwort
| data-sort-value="text Wohl weinen Gottes Engel" | Wohl weinen Gottes Engel
| data-sort-value="1815-10-19" | 19/10/1815
| data-sort-value="Text by Kosegarten, Ludwig Gotthard, Wohl weinen Gottes Engel" | Text by Kosegarten
|-
| 320
| 320
| data-sort-value="XXX,1895" | (1895)
| data-sort-value="2003,167" | XX, 3No. 167
| data-sort-value="409,48" | IV, 9 No. 48
| data-sort-value="Zufriedene, Der" | Der Zufriedene
| data-sort-value="text Zwar schuf das Gluck hienieden" | Zwar schuf das Glück hienieden
| data-sort-value="1815-10-23" | 23/10/1815
| data-sort-value="Text by Reissig, Christian Ludwig von, Zwar schuf das Gluck hienieden"| Text by 
|-
| 321
| 321
| data-sort-value="XXX,1832" | (1832)
| data-sort-value="2003,168" | XX, 3No. 168
| data-sort-value="409,49" | IV, 9 No. 49
| Mignon a.k.a. Mignons Gesang
| data-sort-value="text Kennst du das Land" | Kennst du das Land
| data-sort-value="1815-10-23" | 23/10/1815
| data-sort-value="Text by Goethe, Johann Wolfgang von from Wilhelm Meister's Apprenticeship III, 1 Kennst du das Land" | Text by Goethe, from Wilhelm Meister's Apprenticeship III, 1
|-
| 322
| 322
| data-sort-value="XXX,1837" | (1837)
| data-sort-value="2003,169" | XX, 3No. 169
| data-sort-value="409,50" | IV, 9 No. 50
| Hermann und Thusnelda
| data-sort-value="text Ha, dort kommt er" | Ha, dort kömmt er
| data-sort-value="1815-10-27" | 27/10/1815
| data-sort-value="Text by Klopstock, Friedrich Gottlieb, Ha, dort kommt er" | Text by Klopstock
|-
| data-sort-value="323" | 323991
| 323
| data-sort-value="XXX,1895" | (1895)
| data-sort-value="2003,172" | XX, 3No. 172
| data-sort-value="409,51" | IV, 9 No. 51 Anh. Nos. 5–6
| Klage der Ceres
| data-sort-value="text Ist der holde Lenz erschienen?" | Ist der holde Lenz erschienen?
| data-sort-value="1816-06-01" | 9/11/1815–June 1816
| data-sort-value="Text by Schiller, Friedrich, Ist der holde Lenz erschienen?" | Text by Schiller; Two versions: 2nd in AGA; A fragment of the last part was D 991
|-
| 324
| 324
| data-sort-value="141,1837-0" | 141p(1837)
| data-sort-value="1301,003" | XIII, 1No. 3
| data-sort-value="102,01" | I, 2
| Mass No. 3
| data-sort-value="key B-flat major" | B majorKyrie – Gloria – Credo – Sanctus & Benedictus – Agnus Dei
| data-sort-value="1815-11-11" | started11/11/1815
| data-sort-value="Text: Mass ordinary 09" | Text: Mass ordinary (other settings: , 31, 45, 49, 56, 66, 105, 167, 452, 678, 755 and 950); For satbSATB and orchestra
|-
| data-sort-value="999.03241" |
| data-sort-value="324.1" | 324A
| data-sort-value="ZZZZ" |
| data-sort-value="ZZZZ" |
| data-sort-value="408,41" | IV, 8No. 41
| Winterlied, D 324A
| data-sort-value="ZZZZ" |
| 1816?
| data-sort-value="ZZZZ" |
|-
| 325
| 325
| data-sort-value="XXX,1895" | (1895)
| data-sort-value="2003,173" | XX, 3No. 173
| data-sort-value="401,1121" | IV, 1b No. 9
| Harfenspieler, D 325
| data-sort-value="text Wer sich der Einsamkeit ergibt 1" | Wer sich der Einsamkeit ergibt
| data-sort-value="1815-11-13" | 13/11/1815
| data-sort-value="Text by Goethe, Johann Wolfgang von from Wilhelm Meister's Apprenticeship, Wer sich der Einsamkeit ergibt 1" | Text by Goethe, from Wilhelm Meister's Apprenticeship (other setting:  No. 1)
|-
| 326
| 326
| data-sort-value="XXX,1888" | (1888)
| data-sort-value="1502,004" | XV, 2No. 4
| data-sort-value="203,00" | II, 3
| data-sort-value="Freunde von Salamanka, Die" | Die Freunde von Salamanka
| data-sort-value="theatre (Singspiel in 2 acts)" | (Singspiel in two acts)
| data-sort-value="1815-12-30" | 18/11/1815–31/12/1815
|-
| 327
| 327
| data-sort-value="ZZZZ" |
| data-sort-value="ZZZZ" |
| data-sort-value="410,00" | IV, 10
| Lorma, D 327
| data-sort-value="text Lorma sass in der Halle von Aldo 1" | Lorma saß in der Halle von Aldo
| data-sort-value="1815-11-28" | 28/11/1815
| data-sort-value="Text by Macpherson, James (Ossian) from The Battle of Lora, Lorma sass in der Halle von Aldo 1" | Text by Macpherson (Ossian), from The Battle of Lora, transl. by E. Baron de Harold; Fragment
|-
| 328
| 328
| data-sort-value="001,1821-0" | 1(1821)(1895)
| data-sort-value="2003,178" | XX, 3No. 178
| data-sort-value="401,0010" | IV, 1a &b No. 1
| data-sort-value="Erlkonig" | Erlkönig
| data-sort-value="text Wer reitet so spat durch Nacht und Wind?" | Wer reitet so spät durch Nacht und Wind?
| data-sort-value="1815-11-01" | October1815?
| data-sort-value="Text by Goethe, Johann Wolfgang von, Wer reitet so spat durch Nacht und Wind?" | Text by Goethe; Four versions: 2nd and 3rd switched in AGA – 4th is Op. 1
|-
| 329
| 329
| data-sort-value="XXX,1895" | (1895)
| data-sort-value="2010,591" | XX, 10No. 591
| data-sort-value="409,97" | IV, 9Anh. No. 7
| data-sort-value="Drei Sanger, Die" | Die drei Sänger
| data-sort-value="text Der Konig sass beim frohen Mahle" | Der König saß beim frohen Mahle
| data-sort-value="1815-12-23" | 23/12/1815
|-
| data-sort-value="999.03291" |
| data-sort-value="329.1" | 329A
| data-sort-value="ZZZZ" |
| data-sort-value="ZZZZ" |
| data-sort-value="302,92" | III, 2b Anh. No. 3VIII, 2 No. 27
| data-sort-value="Grab, Das, D 329A" | Das Grab, D 329A
| data-sort-value="text Das Grab ist tief und stille 1" | Das Grab ist tief und stille
| data-sort-value="1815-12-28" | 28/12/1815?
| data-sort-value="Text by Salis-Seewis, Johann Gaudenz von, Das Grab ist tief und stille 1" | Text by Salis-Seewis (other settings: , 377, 569 and 643A); Canon for SATB; Sketch
|-
| 330
| 330
| data-sort-value="XXX,1895" | (1895)
| data-sort-value="2003,182" | XX, 3No. 182
| data-sort-value="303,14" | III, 3 No. 14Anh. I No. 2
| data-sort-value="Grab, Das, D 330" | Das Grab, D 330
| data-sort-value="text Das Grab ist tief und stille 2" | Das Grab ist tief und stille
| data-sort-value="1815-12-28" | 28/12/1815
| data-sort-value="Text by Salis-Seewis, Johann Gaudenz von, Das Grab ist tief und stille 2" | Text by Salis-Seewis (other settings: , 377, 569 and 643A); For choir and piano
|}

Lists of compositions by Franz Schubert
Compositions by Franz Schubert
Schubert